= List of loudspeaker manufacturers =

This is a list of notable manufacturers of loudspeakers. In regard to notability, this is not intended to be an all-inclusive list; it is a list of manufacturers especially noted for their loudspeakers and which have articles on Wikipedia. To see more manufacturers, please refer to the category Loudspeaker manufacturers.

Name	Country
Acoustic Research	United States
Advent	United States
Alesis	United States
Altec Lansing	United States
Amphion Loudspeakers	Finland
Anker	China
Armstrong Audio	United Kingdom
ATC	United Kingdom
Audiovox	United States
Audison	Italy
Auro-3D	Belgium
Bang & Olufsen	Denmark
Barefoot Sound	United States
BassBoss	United States
Behringer	Germany
Blaupunkt	Germany
Bosch	Germany
Bose	United States
Boston Acoustics	United States
Bowers & Wilkins	United Kingdom
Bozak	United States
Burmester Audiosysteme	Germany
Cabasse	France
Canton Electronics	Germany
Castle Acoustics (now Castle)	United Kingdom
Celestion	United Kingdom
Cerwin-Vega	United States
Clair Brothers	United States
Clair Global	United States
Clarion	Japan
Community Professional Loudspeakers	United States
Creative	Singapore
d&b Audiotechnik	Germany
DALI	Denmark
Definitive Technology	United States
Denon	Japan
DEQX	Australia
Devialet	France
Duntech	Australia
Dynacord	Germany
Dynaudio	Denmark
Eastern Acoustic Works	United States
Edifier	China
Elac	Germany
Electro-Voice	United States
Epos	United Kingdom
Focal-JMLab	France
Fostex	Japan
Funktion-One	United Kingdom
Genelec	Finland
Harman Kardon	United States
Infinity	United States
Jamo	Denmark
JBL	United States
Jensen	United States
JL Audio	United States
JLab Audio	United States
JVC	Japan
K-array	Italy
KEF	United Kingdom (brand)
Kenwood	Japan
Kharma International	Netherlands
KLH	United States
Klipsch	United States
Krell Industries	United States
KRK	United States
Kustom	United States
L-Acoustics	France
Legacy Audio	United States
Linn	United Kingdom
Lipinski Sound	United States
Logitech	Switzerland and United States
Mackie	United States
Magnepan	United States
Marshall Amplification	United Kingdom
MartinLogan	United States
McIntosh Laboratory	United States
Meyer Sound Laboratories	United States
Meridian Audio	United Kingdom
Mission	United Kingdom (brand)
Magnat	Germany
Mitek/MTX	United States
Monitor Audio	United Kingdom
Mordaunt-Short	United Kingdom
Naim	United Kingdom
NHT Loudspeakers	United States
Onkyo	Japan
Oswalds Mill Audio	United States
Panasonic	Japan
Peavey Electronics	United States
Philips	Netherlands
Pioneer	Japan
PMC speakers	United Kingdom
Polk Audio	United States
ProAc	United Kingdom
PSB Speakers	Canada
QSC Audio Products	United States
Quad Electroacoustics	United Kingdom (brand)
Radio Shack	United States
RCF audio	Italy
Rectilinear Research Corporation	United States
Rega Research	United Kingdom
Renkus-Heinz	United States
ReVox	Switzerland
Rogers International	United Kingdom (brand)
Sansui	Japan
Sennheiser	Germany
Sherwood	United States
SMS Audio	United States
Snell	United States
Sonodyne	India
Sonos	United States
Sonus Faber	Italy
Sony	Japan
Spendor	United Kingdom
Tannoy	United Kingdom (brand)
Technics	Japan
Teledyne	United States
Telefunken	Germany
Teufel Audio	Germany
Thiel Audio	United States
TOA Corp.	Japan
U-Turn Audio	United States
Vandersteen	United States
Velodyne Acoustics	United States
Veritone Minimum Phase Speakers	United States
Vifa	Denmark
Wharfedale	United Kingdom (brand)
Wilson Audio	United States
Wilson Benesch	United Kingdom
Yamaha	Japan
Yorkville Sound	Canada
ZR Speaker Lab	Slovenia
Zu Audio	United States

== See also ==
- Acoustic transmission line
- Audiophile
- Frequency response
- High-end audio
- Loudspeaker acoustics
- Loudspeaker measurement
- Lists of companies
- List of studio monitor manufacturers
