= ATC (loudspeaker manufacturer) =

British audio hardware manufacturer

ATC (Acoustic Transducer Company)
- Industry: Audio
- Founded: 1974; 52 years ago
- Founder: Billy Woodman
- Headquarters: Gloucestershire, United Kingdom
- Products: Studio monitors, Hi-Fi-Loudspeakers, Subwoofers, Amplifiers
- Owner: Loudspeaker Technology Ltd.
- Number of employees: 70 (2024)
- Website: atc.audio

ATC (former Acoustic Transducer Company, now a brand of Loudspeaker Technology Ltd.) is a British audio equipment manufacturer headquartered in Gloucestershire, United Kingdom, serving the professional and home audio markets. Their products include studio monitors, loudspeaker for HIFI, subwoofers, amplifiers and CD players. ATC designs and manufactures all its drivers, crossovers, and amplifiers in-house in the UK.

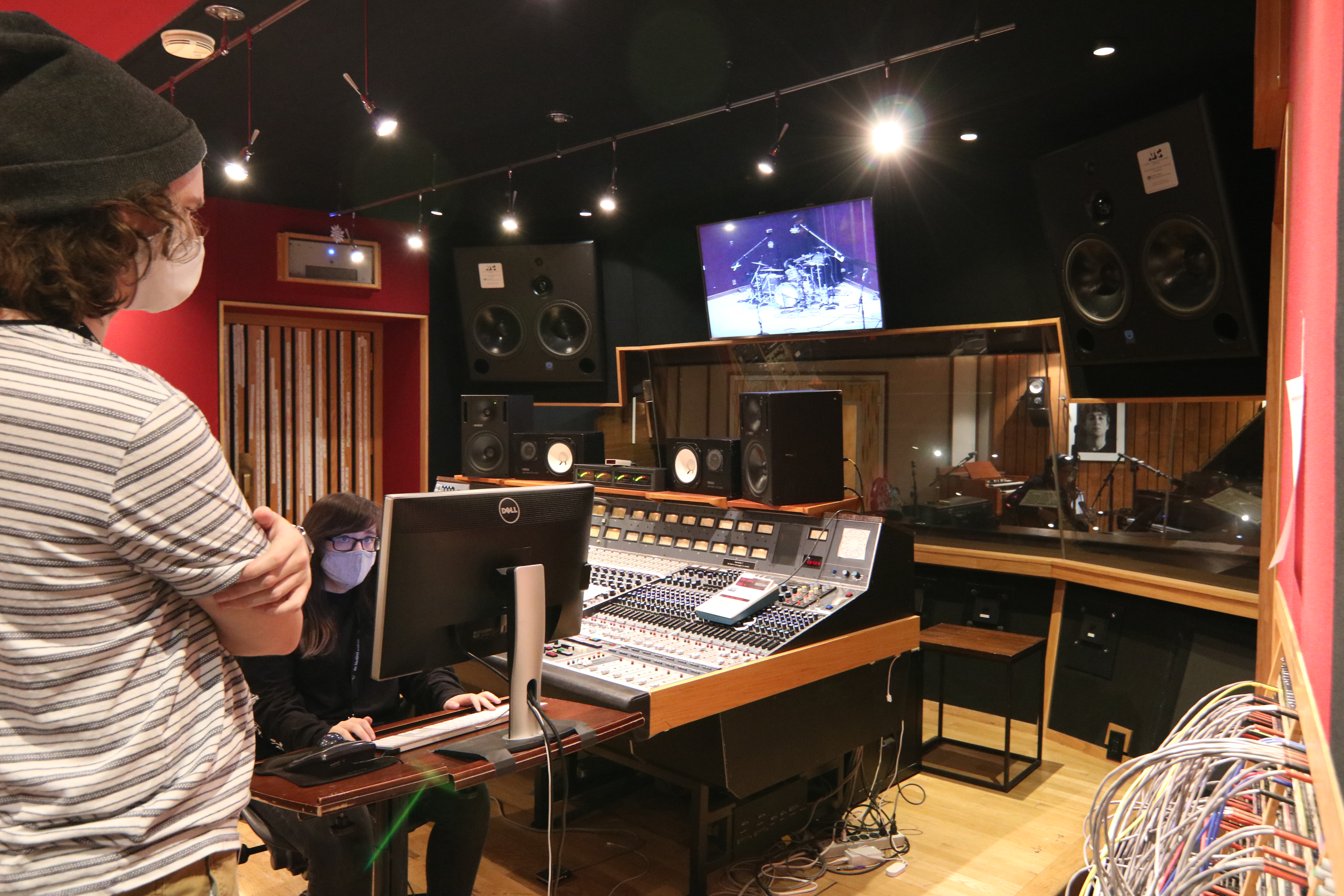
Blackbird Studio, USA. Large format ATC SCM300ASL main monitors in the background – Phil Madeira, Nov. 16-18, 2021 - The Blackbird Academy

== History ==
ATC was established in 1974 by Billy Woodman, an Australian engineer with a background in piano performance and engineering. The company initially focused on producing high-performance loudspeaker drive units for professional audio applications.

In 1976, ATC developed the SM75-150s, a soft dome midrange driver notable for its wide bandwidth and uniform dispersion.

During the 1980s, the company expanded its product line to include complete loudspeaker systems and began developing active monitoring solutions that integrated active audio crossovers and power amplifiers.

By the mid-1990s, ATC started offering standalone audiophile electronic components. In the late 1990s Super Linear (SL) technology was introduced.

The company remained under the leadership of Billy Woodman until his death in 2022, after which his son, Will Woodman, took over as Managing Director.

== Professional application ==
ATC's audio monitoring solutions were adopted by various professional users, including musicians, audio engineers, recording studios, mastering studios, broadcasting organizations, and concert halls, e.g.

- Abbey Road Studios
- BBC
- Blackbird Studio
- Chuck Ainlay
- Gavin Lurssen
- Lenny Kravitz
- Les Paul Recording Studio
- Circle Studios (Sony Music)
- Sydney Opera House
- Val Garay
- and Walt Disney Concert Hall.

== Hi-Fi Awards & Recognition ==
ATC is a manufacturer of professional studio monitors that also offer loudspeakers for the high-end home audio market, alongside brands such as JBL, Genelec, PMC Ltd. and Focal. Their loudspeakers have been recognized in various industry publications and award programs for their performance in the high-fidelity market:

=== The Absolute Sound ===
- ATC SCM20P - Golden Ear Award 2023
- ATC SCM50 ASLT - Golden Ear Award 2019

=== Stereophile ===
- ATC SCM19 - Recommended Components: Loudspeakers, 2017 Edition
- ATC SCM7 - Recommended Components: Loudspeakers, 2017 Edition
- ATC SCM19 - Recommended Components: Loudspeakers, 2016 Edition
- ATC SCM7 - Recommended Components: Loudspeakers, 2016 Edition
- ATC SCM19 - Recommended Components: Loudspeakers, 2015 Edition
- ATC SCM7 - Recommended Components: Loudspeakers, 2015 Edition
- ATC SCM7 - Recommended Components: Loudspeakers, 2014 Edition
- ATC SCM11 - Recommended Components: Loudspeakers, 2013 Edition
- ATC SCM40 - Recommended Components: Loudspeakers, 2012 Edition
- ATC SCM11 - Recommended Components: Loudspeakers, 2012 Edition

=== What Hi-Fi? ===
- ATC SCM11 - Best standmounter £1200-£2000, Awards 2017
- ATC SCM11 - Best standmounter £1200-£1500, Awards 2016
- ATC SCM11 - Best standmounter £800-£1200, Awards 2015
- ATC SCM11 - Best standmounter £800-£1200, Awards 2014
- ATC SCM11 - Best standmounter £800-£1500, Awards 2013
- ATC SCM11 - The What Hi-Fi? Hall of Fame: the best Hi-Fi of the 2000s

== See also ==
- List of studio monitor manufacturers
- List of loudspeaker manufacturers
