= Acapella Audio Arts =

- Industry: Electronics
- Founded: 1978
- Founder: Alfred Rudolph and Herman Winters
- Headquarters: Duisburg, Germany
- Website: www.acapella.de

Acapella Audio Arts is a German manufacturer of loudspeakers, and one of the oldest hi-fi manufactures in Germany. Acapella Audio was founded by Alfred Rudolph and Herman Winters in 1978 in Duisburg, Germany. Acapella is famous for its heavy horn-loaded speakers that are able to reproduce the whole audible sound spectrum. Other signature characteristic for the products of the company is the widely utilized plasma tweeter technology.

The company's flagship product, the Sphäron Excalibur has earned the company worldwide recognition. Standing at over seven feet tall and weighing 2,728 pounds, this $455,000 speaker is considered one of the world's most unusual speakers.

== History ==
In 1961 while a student at architecture school, Alfred Rudolph made and designed 4-way speakers with an appealing sound. But after many sessions listening to the sound of trumpets, he became fascinated by the wide and vivid sound of them; this is when the idea of creating a modern trumpet came to the mind of Rudolph. In 1976, Alfred Rudolph and Hermann Winters met, both immediately felt the same fascination with the idea of the trumpet. Two years later, Acapella Audio Arts officially launched.

== Technologies ==
=== The Ion-Plasma Tweeter ===
The Ion-Plasma Tweeter is designed to recreate the most accurate, fastest and most sophisticated sound compared to the existing speakers in the world. When operating, the ion-beam fires plasma into oxygen in the air which can produce reactive by-products, Acapella is the only speaker company that eliminates this problem and is certified for health safety by the European Union (EU). In this way, the Acapella ion tweeter is able to reproduce sound without membrane and without mass. In terms of transient capabilities and phase stiffness, the obtained sound quality cannot be realised by using conventional tweeters. With virtually zero mass, the ion tweeter can reproduce frequencies as high as 100 kHz, though in this case, it's limited to 30 kHz.

=== The Spherical Horn ===
Though the senior firm of the two, Acapella is actually not nearly as internationally famous as their colleagues at Avantgarde Acoustic. Both German companies are in the hornspeaker business but Acapella, as the older one, claims credit for being the spherical horn inventors (they began in 1978). The Avantgardists under the lead of Matthias Ruff meanwhile produce strikingly similar horns.

== Products ==
=== Acapella Campanile MKII ===
Specifications:

- Efficiency: 93 dB/1W/1m
- Impedance: 8 Ohm
- Frequency Response: 20 Hz to 40 kHz
- Power handling: 200 watts (Peak handling of 1000 watts at 10 ms with no distortion)
- Recommended power output of the amplifier: from 15 watts
- Overall Dimensions: 94.5" x 28.5" x 38" (HxWxD)
- Weight: 550 - 650 lbs. per speaker

=== Acapella LaCampanella Alto MKIII ===
Specifications:

- Frequency Response: 20 Hz to 40 kHz
- Efficiency: 95 dB/1W/1m
- Power Handling: 100 watts (Peak handling of 1000 watts at 10 ms with no distortion)
- Recommended power output of the amplifier: 15 watts
- Dimensions: 88" x 16" x 27" (HxWxD)
- Weight: 352 lbs. per speaker

=== Acapella Sphaeron Excalibur ===
Specifications:

- Efficiency: 100 dB/1W/1m
- Power handling: 100 watts (Peak handling of 1000 watts at 10 ms with no distortion)
- Recommended power output of the amplifier from: 15 watts
- Dimensions: 90.5" x 59" x 51.2" (HxWxD)
- Weight: 1364 lbs. per Speaker

=== Acapella ION TW 1S Ionic Plasma Tweeter ===
Specifications:

- Sensitivity: 1.5 V / 0 dB (active tweeter)
- Impedance: 600 ohm
- Max Sound Pressure level: 110 dB, 1 m / 1 ms
- Slope Input Filter: approx. 12 dB / Octave
- Frequency Response: 5 kHz - 50 kHz (variable crossover frequencies)
- Mains Voltage: 110–120 V / 60 Hz
- Dimensions: 150 x 300 x 260 mm / 5.91 x 11.81 x 10.24" (H xWxD)
- Weight: 15 kg. / 33 lbs.

== See also ==
- List of loudspeaker manufacturers
- High end audio
- Horn loudspeakers
- Klipsch Audio Technologies
- Oswalds Mill Audio
