= KRK Music =

Manufacturer of professional audio equipment

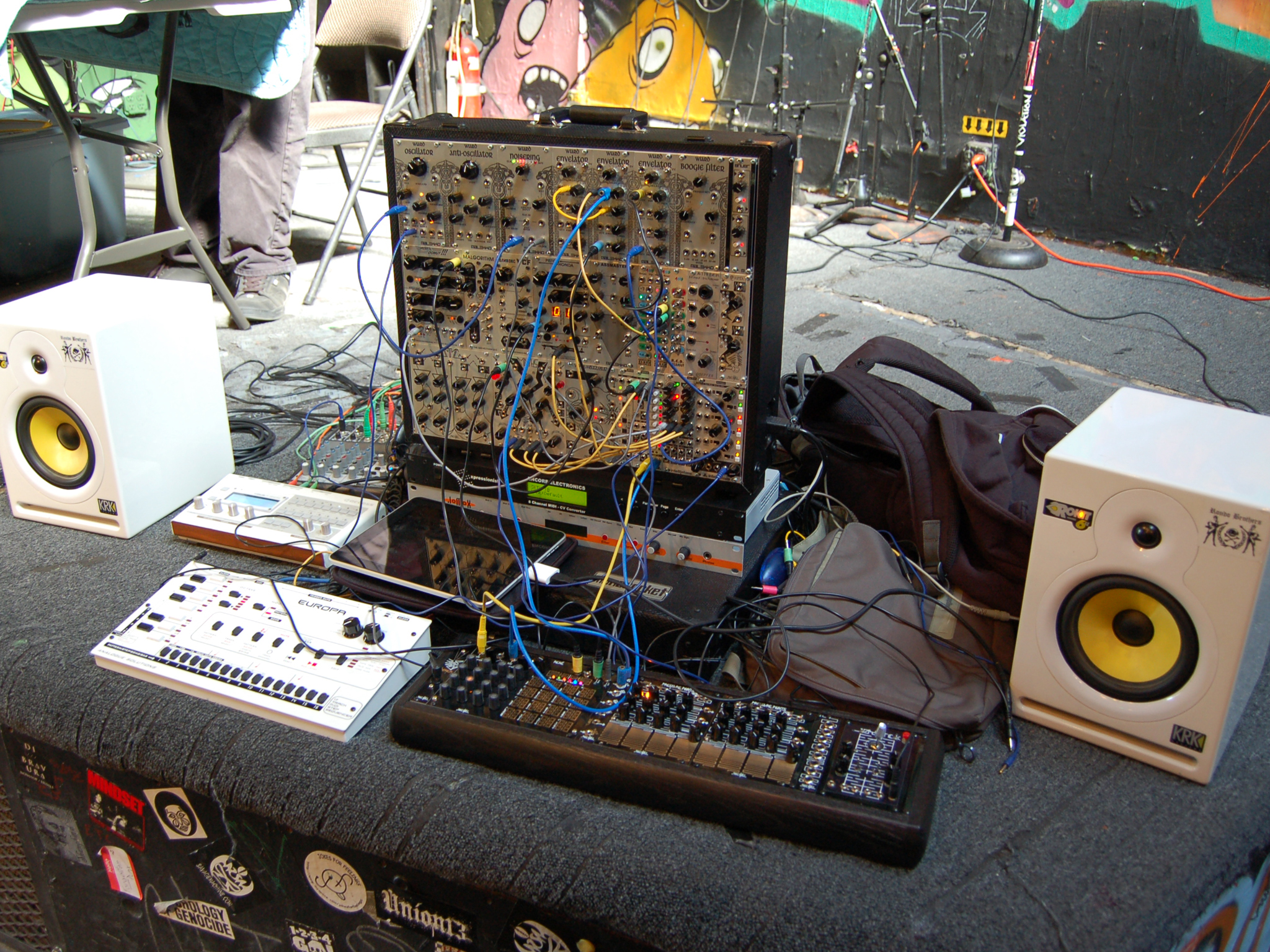

KRK Music (or KRK Systems) is an American manufacturer of professional studio monitors and audio equipment. The company was founded in 1986 by recording engineer Keith R. Klawitter in Huntington Beach, California. KRK is best known for its nearfield studio monitors, particularly the Rokit series, which are widely used in home and professional recording studios. Gibson acquired KRK in 2011 as part of its acquisition of the Stanton Group, incorporating the brand into its professional audio division.
