= K-array =

Italian audio equipment manufacturer

- Company type: Public Company
- Industry: Audio electronics
- Founded: 1990 Florence, Italy
- Founders: Carlo Tatini, Alessandro Tatini and Massimo Ferrati
- Headquarters: Scarperia e San Piero, Tuscany, Italy
- Area served: Worldwide
- Products: Audio electronics
- Number of employees: 60 (2017)
- Website: k-array.com

K-array is an Italy-based manufacturer of loudspeakers and amplification products for the professional audio market. K-array’s products are sold in over 50 countries around the world, and have been used in a variety of environments including major concert tours, cathedrals, stadia, theatres, restaurants and hotels.

== History ==
In 1990, innovative entrepreneurs Carlo Tatini, Alessandro Tatini and Massimo Ferrati founded HP Sound Equipment to design and fit-out broadcast studios for television and radio. After noticing that unbalanced lavalier microphones would pick up hum from electrical equipment nearby, such as dimmers and power distribution, the group created a miniature microphone with integrated pre-amp inside the cartridge. Later, HP Sound began expanding into the manufacture of other product categories, including their own line of MI equipment, and designing OEM solutions for other manufacturers.

In 2005, HP Sound re-positioned their loudspeaker products into a new brand and K-array was named. Shortly after, the live sound-focused company launched its flagship Concert Series range of small-footprint line array products, designed to minimize transport and storage costs during touring. The brand’s first product, the KH4 loudspeaker, weighed 100 lbs and had a depth of 6”.

In the years that followed, K-array has continued to develop line array solutions, including the flat-panel line array modules, alongside slim line column loudspeakers, micro loudspeakers with integrated LED lighting, a flexible rope-like loudspeaker, and a moving head loudspeaker with integrated camera.

In 2020, KSCAPE, a new division of K-array, combines innovative audio with high-end light in one product to provide architects and designers with a single solution that merges senses. RAIL is a 1.2 meter homogenous linear LED track light with full-range cone drivers.

== Technology ==
K-array has a number of technology ranges that it integrates into products, including SAT (Slim Array Technology).

Slim Array Technology (SAT) was developed to confront issues using large line array elements by substituting the big enclosures with slim boxes. Whereas a big air volume inside a large speaker box in a standard line array is necessary to maximize the speaker efficiency in the mid-low frequency range, a slim box allows sound to exit instantaneously without resonance, generating a significant amount of sound pressure in the low and low-mid range with a fast transient response. Therefore, all sounds characterized by fast transients, like percussion instruments, are reproduced in a more natural way.

== Products ==
=== Loudspeakers ===
- Concert Series – Mugello, Firenze (Slim Array Technology-equipped, flat line array elements), Owl (moving head audio) and Mastiff monitor lines
- Installed Sound – Anakonda, Domino, Dragon, Kayman, Kobra, Lyzard, Python, Rumble, Thunder, Tornado, Turtle and Vyper lines
- Portable Systems – Axle and Pinnacle sub-and-satellite systems

=== Amplifiers ===
- Kommander power amplifiers

=== Software ===
- K-framework – K-array product management software, integrated with Dante audio networking, USB and RS485
- Owl-Manager – software to manage the Owl-KW8 moving-head loudspeaker, with HDSDI and DMX compatibility

== Accolades ==
- EMEA InAVation Awards 2014, Most InAVative Loudspeaker - Anakonda KAN200
- InfoComm 2014 Best Of Show - Anakonda KAN200
- Induction into MuDeTo, the online museum that recognizes Tuscan design excellence, for the Anakonda.

== See also ==
- List of loudspeaker manufacturers
