= PSB =

PSB may refer to:

== Finance and education ==
- Philippine Savings Bank
- Promsvyazbank, a Russian state-owned bank
- Punjab & Sind Bank, Northern India (NSE: PSB)
- PS Business Parks, an American real estate investment trust (NYSE: PSB)
- PSB Insights, a market research firm (Penn Schoen Berland)
- Paris School of Business, a private business school located in Paris
- Penn State Behrend, a commonwealth Pennsylvania State University campus in Erie, PA.
- Public Schools Branch, the English school district of Prince Edward Island, Canada
- Public Schools of Brookline, a school district of Brookline, Massachusetts, United States

== Historiography, government, and politics ==
- Polski Słownik Biograficzny, a Polish encyclopedia
- Brunei History Centre (Malay: Pusat Sejarah Brunei), a government body in Brunei
- Public service broadcasting in the United Kingdom
- Psychological Strategy Board, a U.S. government committee set up by the Truman administration to coordinate and plan psychological warfare operations
- Presidential Service Badge, of the US military
- Public security bureau (China), the name for a police department in mainland China
- Belgian Socialist Party (French: Parti Socialiste belge)
- Brazilian Socialist Party (Portuguese: Partido Socialista Brasileiro)
- United Sarawak Party, (Malay: Parti Sarawak Bersatu), a political party in Sarawak, Malaysia

== Life sciences, technology, and music ==
- Purple sprouting broccoli
- Phosphate solubilizing bacteria
- Purple sulfur bacteria
- Protected specimen brush, a tool used for sampling of sputum from the lungs
- Pacific Symposium on Biocomputing, an annual scientific meeting
- .PSB (short for "Photoshop Big"), an Adobe Photoshop file format
- Proton Synchrotron Booster, a particle accelerator at CERN
- Polysulfide–bromide battery
- PSB Speakers, a Canadian loudspeaker company
- Pet Shop Boys, an English musical duo
- Plus-Tech Squeeze Box, a Japanese Shibuya-kei band
- Public Service Broadcasting (band), a British electronic trio

== Other uses ==
- Persistent slip bands in metals
- Mid-State Regional Airport (IATA airport code "PSB"), an airport in Philipsburg, Pennsylvania
- Poplar Street Bridge, a bridge across the Mississippi River
