= Klein + Hummel =

Former German manufacturer of professional audio equipment

- Founded: 1945
- Defunct: 2009

Klein + Hummel was a German manufacturer of professional audio equipment, including studio monitors, public address systems, broadcast equipment, amplifiers and high-fidelity audio components.

Founded shortly after the Second World War by Walter Hummel, Horst Klein and Heinrich Brumm, the company became one of Germany's best-known manufacturers of active studio monitors for professional recording and broadcast applications.

In 2005, the company was acquired by Sennheiser, and its studio monitor business was transferred to Georg Neumann GmbH in 2009. The company's loudspeaker designs continue under Neumann's KH series, with the "KH" designation retained in reference to Klein + Hummel.

== History ==
Klein+Hummel was founded in 1945 in Ostfildern by Walter Hummel, Horst Klein and Heinrich Brumm.

Klein+Hummel initially manufactured measurement equipment for the radio and later television industries, as well as professional audio amplifiers and public address (PA) systems.

From around 1955, Klein + Hummel also began producing Hi-Fi amplifiers and tuners. In this segment, the company collaborated for a time with the Black Forest-based firm SABA through a joint venture under the brand name "Telewatt." K+H stopped the development and producing of HiFi consumer systems in the 1970s.

In the early 1960s, the company entered the market for recording studio equipment. K+H developed a high-quality and, at the time, unique tube based filter cascade (equilizer), known as the UE100 (later transistor version: UE1000). It was an analog, high-tech filter system capable of attenuating frequency bands with steep slopes, low distortion, and, most importantly, phase integrity. These units were used in recording studios for the production of phonograph records.

By the 1970s, K&H studio monitors, available in a variety of sizes, along with their amplifiers, had become standard equipment for many German broadcasting organizations at the time. Most of them were user-friendly active systems (O98, O100, O300 etc).

For sound reinforcement in large venues, churches, and expansive facilities, the company continued to build PA amplifiers under the "Telewatt" model line. These featured a modular design, with input channels implemented via plug-in circuit boards. In the PA sector, the K&H name was primarily associated with 100V line systems; this induction transformer–based technology allowed for loudspeaker connections over long distances, though audio quality was limited.
