= List of studio monitor manufacturers =

This is a list of notable manufacturers of studio monitors. This list is not exhaustive; every entry must have an article written in the English Wikipedia.

== Current manufacturers ==
Manufacturer	Country	Product lines
ADAM Audio	Germany	AX series, S series, T series, A series
Alesis	United States	Elevate, M1
Amphion Loudspeakers	Finland	Amphion Create: One and Two series
ATC	UK	Pro, Classic
Barefoot	United States	Footprint01, MiniMain, MicroMain
Behringer	Germany	B series, K series, Media, Studio
Dynaudio	Denmark	Core, LYD
Edifier	China	AirPulse
Focal	France	Alpha, CMS, Shape, SM6, SM9
Genelec	Finland	Classic and SAM™ Compact, Coaxial, Master
JBL	United States	3 series, Control
M-Audio	United States	AV, BX, M3
Mackie	United States	CR, HR, MR, XR
Meyer Sound	United States	Amie, Amie-Sub, Bluehorn
PMC Ltd.	UK	result6, result6
Neumann	Germany	KH
Pioneer	Japan	DM, RM, S
PreSonus	United States	Eris, R series, Sceptre, Temblor
PSI Audio	Switzerland	A14M, A17M, A21M, A23M
Quested	UK	S7R, V310
Sonodyne	India	PM, SM, SRP, SLF
Tannoy	UK	Reveal, Gold
Yamaha	Japan	HS, MSP

== See also ==
- Lists of companies
- List of bass amplifier and loudspeaker manufacturers
- List of loudspeaker manufacturers
