= Zu Audio =

American audio products manufacturer

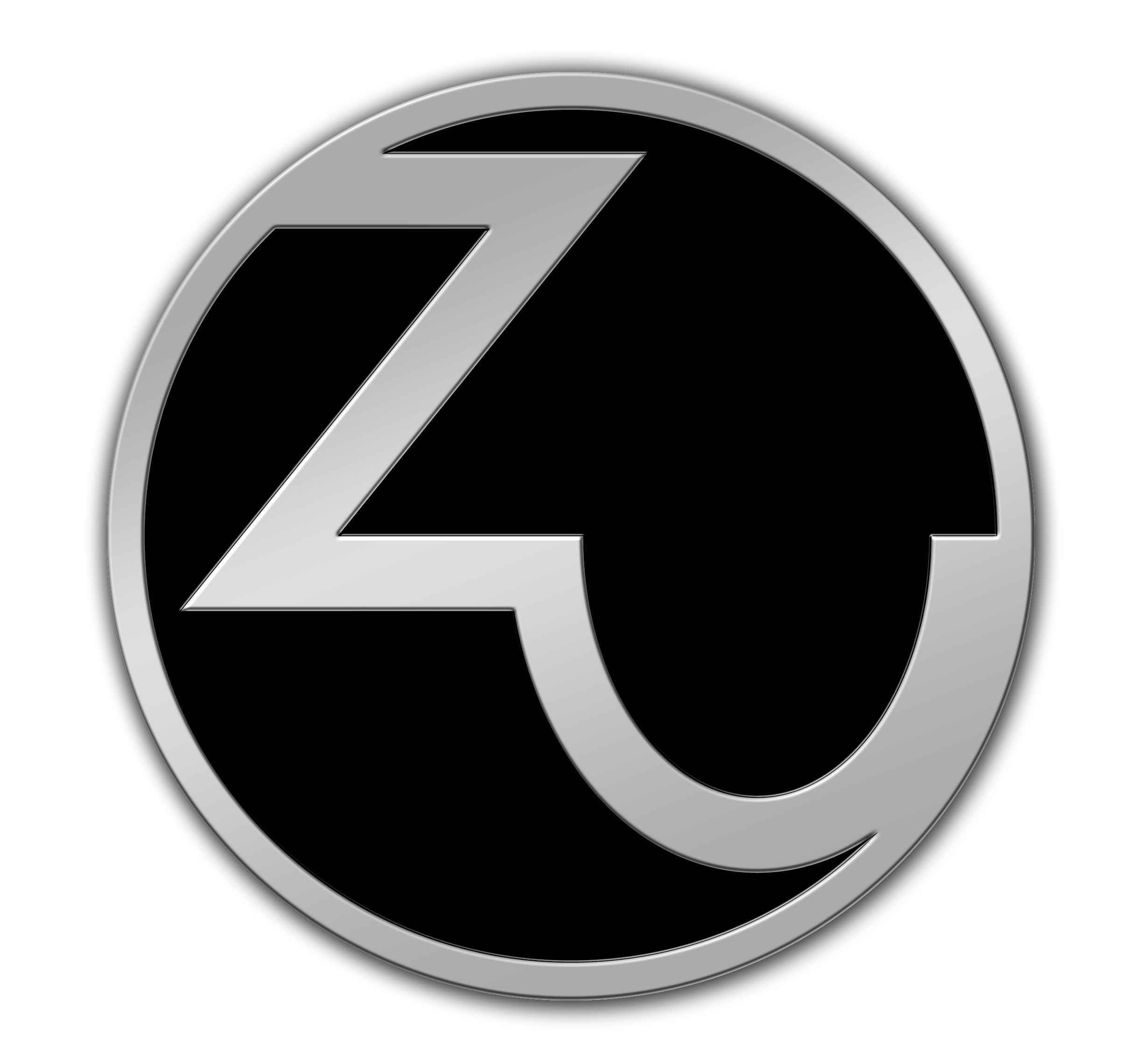
- Company type: Audiophile audio equipment manufacturer
- Founded: 2000
- Founder: Sean Casey
- Headquarters: Ogden, Utah
- Key people: Gerrit Koer, Stefanie Casey, James Read, Layne Reed, Harvey Day
- Products: Audio electronics
- Website: www.zuaudio.com

Zu Audio is an audiophile loudspeaker and cable manufacturer located and established in Ogden, Utah.
