= Lipinski Sound =

American audio equipment manufacturer

- Type: Private
- Industry: Consumer electronics Professional audio
- Founded: 2003
- Headquarters: New York, U.S.
- Key people: Andrew Lipinski, Founder
- Products: Loudspeakers, Audio electronics
- Website: www.lipinskisound.com

Lipinski Sound is a professional market and audiophile oriented manufacturer of loudspeakers, subwoofers, powered speaker stands, surround sound systems, power amplifiers, microphones, and microphone preamplifiers. It is based in San Francisco and Warsaw.

== Background ==
Lipinski Sound Corporation was founded in 2003 in Bethesda, Maryland by Andrew Lipinski. He is an audio engineer and producer of Polish origin, educated in Europe, based in the United States, and professionally active around the globe.

Stereophile Magazine rated Lipinski’s Super Audio CD (SACD) among 75 best surround recordings ever made, saying: "It is a phenomenal demo, both on its own and as proof of how, without any gimmicks, multichannel can improve on two-channel stereo. A great audio and a great musical experience."

== Customers ==
Lipinski Sound professional audio systems and speakers are used in recording and production studios. Since 2006, Dolby Laboratories has been working exclusively on the 7.2 Lipinski Sound surround sound monitoring system for their TrueHD Studio in Tokyo. Other clients include engineers for Led Zeppelin, Rolling Stones, Jay-Z, Missy Elliott, Snoop Dogg, Aretha Franklin, Dire Straits, Sheryl Crow, Peter Frampton, Wynonna Judd, Reba McEntire, and Willie Nelson.
