= Sonodyne =

Indian electronics company

- Type: Private
- Industry: Audio electronics
- Founded: 1970; 56 years ago
- Founder: Ashoke Mukherjee
- Headquarters: Kolkata, India
- Key people: Anindya Mukherjee (CEO)
- Products: Audio equipments; Loudspeakers; Amplifiers
- Website: www.sonodyne.com

Sonodyne Technologies Pvt. Ltd. (also known as Sonodyne) is an Indian electronics company based in Kolkata, India founded in the 1970s by Ashoke Mukherjee. It specializes in audio equipments, amplifiers, speakers and active speakers. Their studio products division operates in over 40 nations. Sonodyne currently operates two research labs, in Kolkata and Mumbai. Sales and project offices are located in Mumbai, Bengaluru, Delhi and Kolkata. Two design centres and three manufacturing centres are located in Kolkata, West Bengal and Mumbai, Maharashtra.

== History ==
The company began when Mukherjee, an engineering student from IIT Roorkee, began designing amplifiers and speakers. The company roped in eminent engineer Subir Pramanik on board as an advisor who trained engineers such as Abhijit Ghose. Loudspeakers and turntables went on the market in the mid 1970s, and component audio systems in the mid 1980s. Around the same time, manufacturing and research was moved to Special Economic Zone, Mumbai. Engineered solutions were developed for professional audio mainly for exports. The company produced OEM products for the high‑end home audio, professional studio and public address markets. These solutions are also available in India along with a range of high performance residential audio systems for music and surround sound. Sonodyne launched its Malhar bluetooth speaker in 2022.

== See also ==
- List of studio monitor manufacturers
