= Barefoot Sound =

American loudspeaker manufacturer

- Industry: Studio monitors
- Founded: 2006, United States
- Founder: Thomas Barefoot and Tedi Sarafian
- Headquarters: United States
- Area served: Worldwide
- Website: barefootsound.com

Barefoot Sound is an American manufacturer of professional studio monitors headquartered in Portland, Oregon. The company was founded in 2006 by Thomas Barefoot and Tedi Sarafian after Thomas Barefoot began hand-building loudspeakers in his garage in San Francisco, California. Barefoot Sound designs and manufactures active loudspeakers for professional recording, mixing, and mastering applications.

== History ==
The company originated from the work of physicist and engineer Thomas Barefoot, who developed his first full-range studio monitor prototype in 2004. Barefoot sought to design a single loudspeaker capable of providing accurate monitoring across a wide frequency range and listening distance. Early monitors were built by hand in San Francisco before the business was formally established in 2006.

As demand increased, Barefoot Sound relocated its operations to Portland, Oregon. The company has expanded from its original flagship systems to a broader product line serving commercial studios, mastering facilities, broadcast environments, and project studios.

== Products and technology ==
Barefoot Sound manufactures active studio monitors in several product lines, including the MiniMain, MicroMain, MasterStack, and Footprint series. Its monitors typically employ sealed enclosures with multiple built-in power amplifiers and digital signal processing.

Among the company's proprietary technologies are:

- Dual-Force™ opposing-woofer architecture, in which two low-frequency drivers are mounted opposite each other to reduce cabinet vibration while extending bass response.
- MEME™ (Multi-Emphasis Monitor Emulation), a DSP-based system that provides alternate voicings intended to emulate the tonal characteristics of several commonly used studio monitors and consumer playback systems.
- SPOC™ (Spectrally Optimized Conversion), a digital crossover and signal-processing system used in selected Barefoot models.

== See also ==
List of studio monitor manufacturers
