= ADAM Audio =

German loudspeaker manufacturer

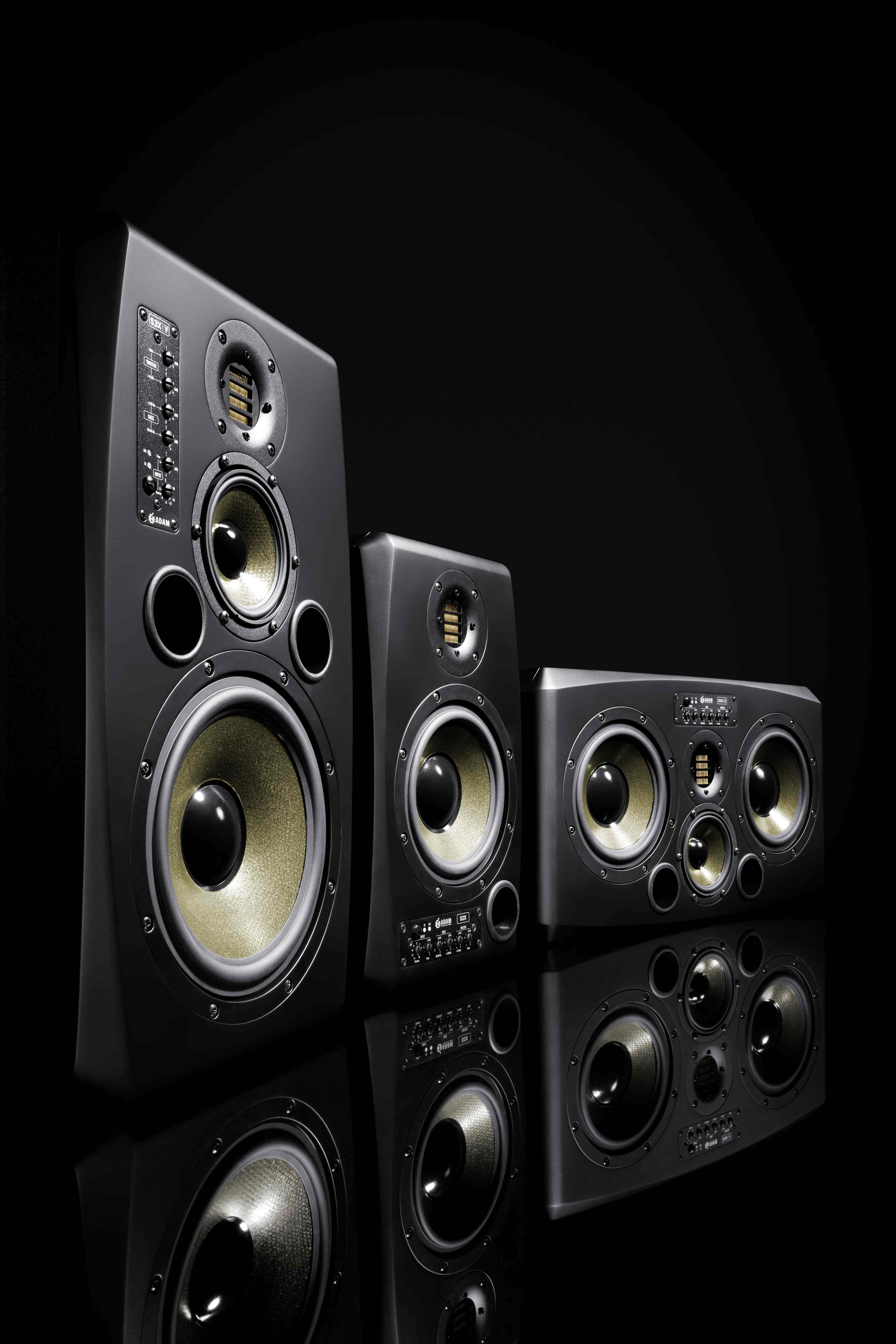
- Founded: 1999
- Headquarters: Berlin, Germany

ADAM Audio (Advanced Dynamic Audio Monitors)is a German manufacturer of active studio monitor loudspeakers headquartered in Berlin. Founded in 1999, the company is best known for its X-ART ribbon tweeter technology, derived from the Air Motion Transformer invented by Oskar Heil. Its products are used in professional recording studios, broadcast facilities, and home studios.

== History ==
ADAM Audio was founded in Berlin in 1999. The company's first products were built around the Accelerating Ribbon Technology (ART) tweeter, based on Oskar Heil's Air Motion Transformer design. ADAM later developed the X-ART tweeter, which became a defining feature of its studio monitors. In 2019, ADAM Audio was acquired by Focusrite plc, becoming part of the Focusrite Group.

== Technology ==
ADAM Audio's loudspeakers are characterized by their use of ribbon tweeters based on the Air Motion Transformer. The company developed the Accelerating Ribbon Technology (ART) tweeter, followed by the X-ART and D-ART variants used across its product ranges.

== Products ==
ADAM Audio manufactures several series of active studio monitors and related audio products. Major product families include the S Series, A Series, and T Series studio monitors, a range of studio subwoofers, and professional headphones.

- T Series
  - T5V
  - T7V
  - T8V
  - T10S (subwoofer)
- A Series
  - A4V
  - A44H
  - A7V
  - A77H
  - A8H
  - Mounting Plate
- S Series
  - S2V
  - S3V
  - S3H
  - S5V
  - S5H
  - Accessories
- Subwoofers
  - Sub8
  - T10S
  - Sub10 MK2
  - Sub12
  - Sub15
  - Sub2100
- Headphones
  - H200
- Desktop Monitors
  - D3V
  - D3V Travel Bag

The T7V was introduced in 2018. It features a 7-inch woofer, a ribbon tweeter, balanced XLR and unbalanced RCA inputs, and rear-panel high- and low-frequency shelving filters for acoustic adjustment.

The A7V, introduced in 2023, succeeded the A7X as ADAM Audio's 7-inch active studio monitor, featuring a Multi-Layer Mineral (MLM) woofer, an X-ART ribbon tweeter, and DSP-based room correction with Ethernet connectivity.

In 2025, ADAM Audio introduced the D3V, a compact desktop studio monitor featuring a D-ART tweeter, a 3.5-inch woofer, dual passive radiators, and USB-C audio connectivity.

== See also ==
- List of studio monitor manufacturers
