= Amphion Loudspeakers =

Finnish loudspeaker manufacturer

Amphion Loudspeakers Ltd.
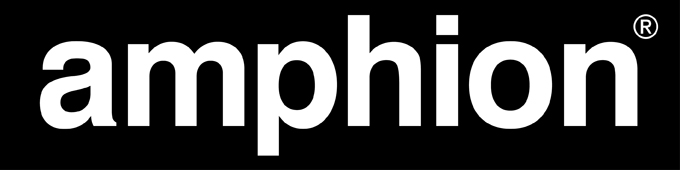
- Native name: Amphion Loudspeakers Oy
- Company type: Private limited company
- Industry: Professional audio, consumer electronics
- Founded: 1998; 27 years ago
- Founder: Anssi Hyvönen
- Headquarters: Kuopio, Finland
- Area served: Worldwide
- Products: Loudspeakers, studio monitors, subwoofers, power amplifiers
- Website: amphion.fi

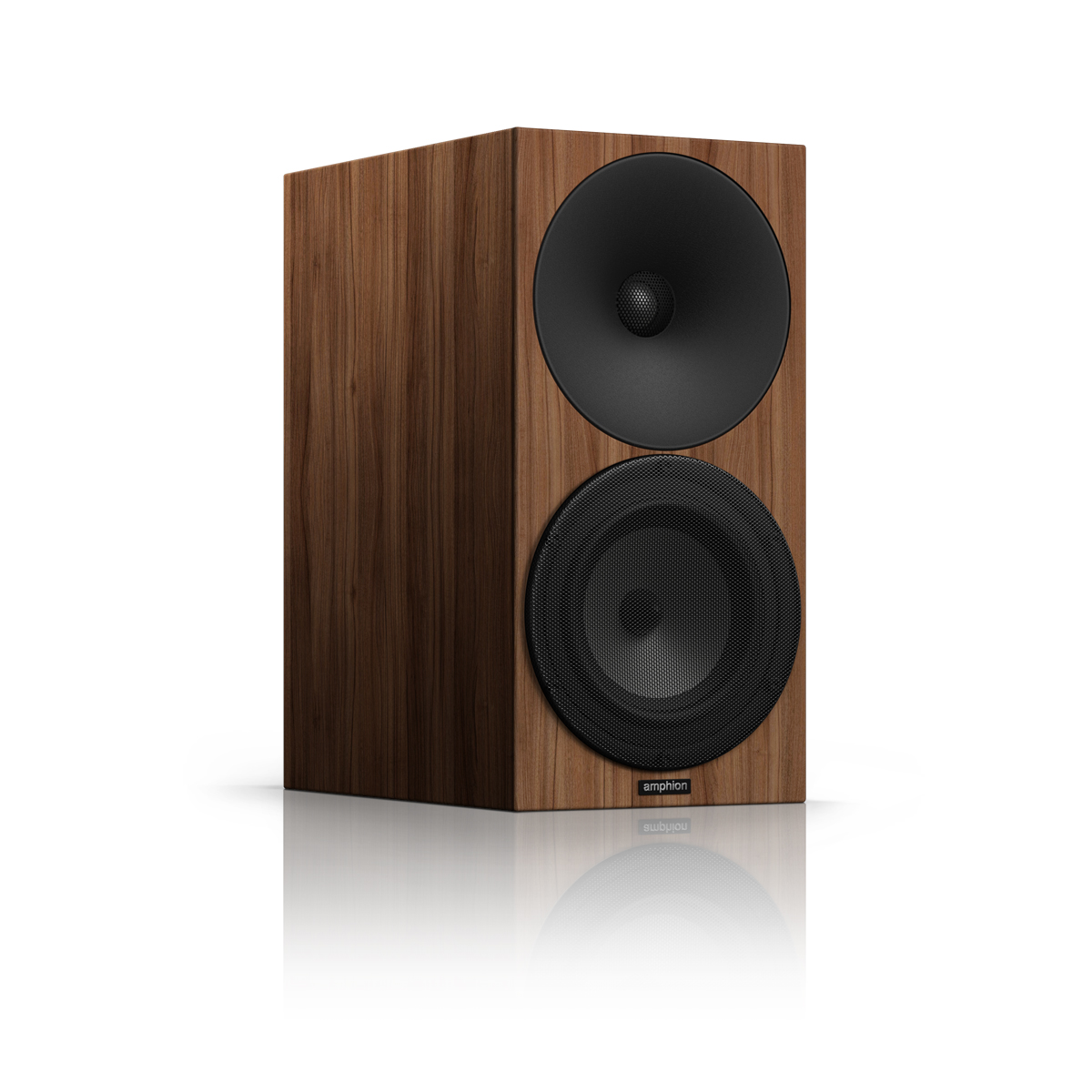
Amphion Argon3S

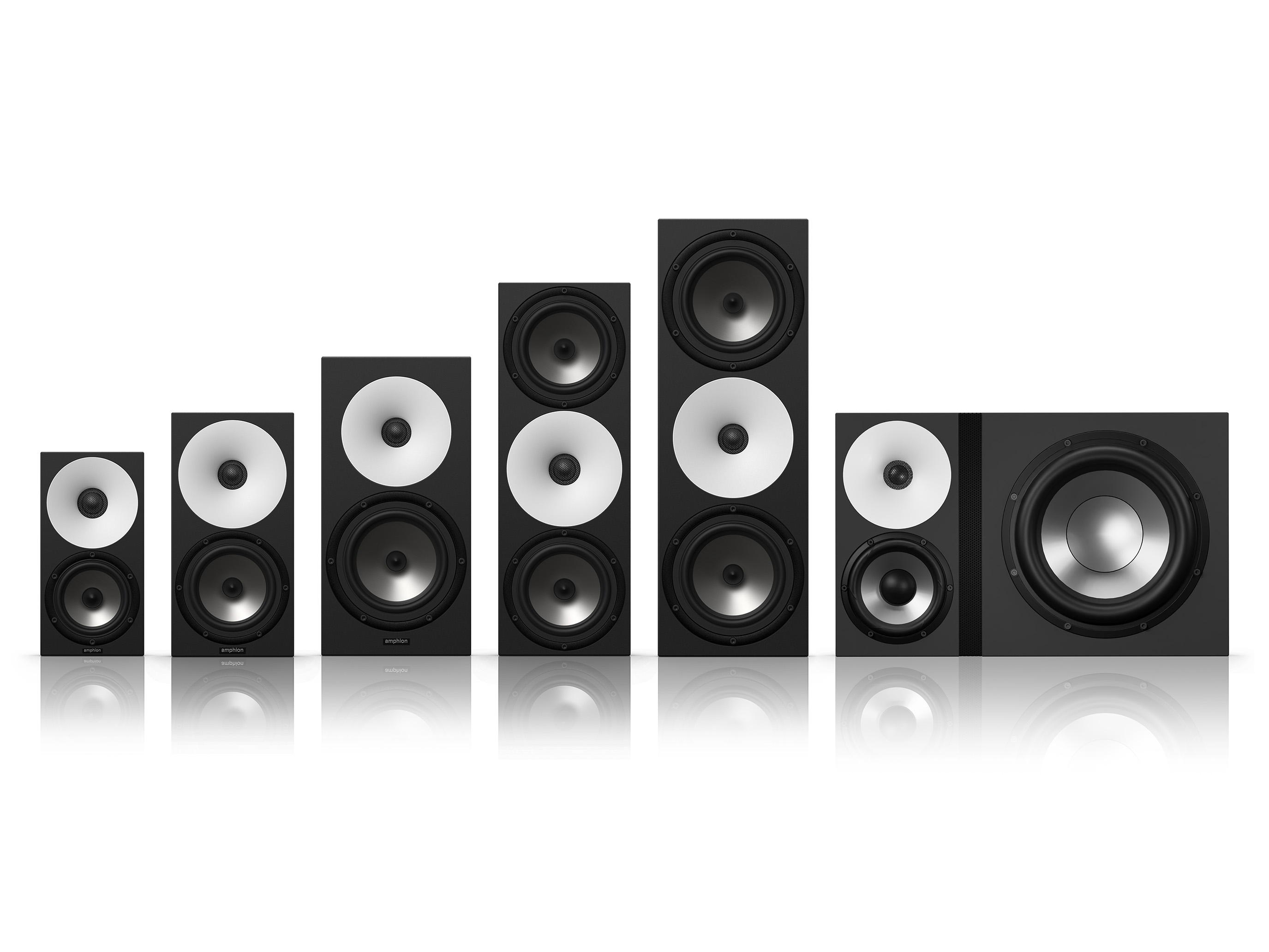
Amphion Studio Monitors

Amphion Loudspeakers Ltd. (Finnish: Amphion Loudspeakers Oy) is a Finnish company that manufactures home loudspeakers and professional studio monitors. It was founded in 1998 by Anssi Hyvönen, and in 2023 it had 17 full-time employees. Amphion's turnover in 2022 was 3.5 million euros. Their acoustic design and product range has received many awards and accolades, and its line-up includes passive speakers, bass extenders, amplifiers, and a newly introduced active monitor One25A.

== History ==
Originally the company based in Helsinki, and in 2000 relocated to Kuopio. While Amphion began as a home loudspeaker manufacturer expanded into studio products in 2013.

The first model of the brand's home speaker line was the Argon, a two-way stand-mount model featuring a 6.5" woofer. Argon is described as the foundation model of Amphion speakers, with technical features including waveguide design and a low crossover point. After Argon, the company introduced the Helium, a compact bookshelf speaker, and shortly after the Xenon, a floorstanding speaker.

In the mid-2010s, Finnish microphone expert Martin Kantola, introduced a pro-version of Amphion's Ion model he had modified to Swedien. After the positive reaction of the Ion prototype from Swedien, Bernie Grundman and a few other renowned sound engineers, the company was inspired to create their own version of a professional product line. With some additional feedback from other audio professionals in Finland, Martin was hired by Amphion to design their initial professional-grade loudspeaker, which would later become known as the One12. After years of further product development with Martin, Amphion introduced the full five-model product range of studio monitors.

In 2022, Amphion moved from their previous location, an old service station converted into a factory, into a new, and much larger facility in Kuopio.

Amphion speakers are handcrafted using primarily Finnish materials. Amphion displays the Association for Finnish Work's Key Flag Symbol, which is given to Finnish companies making products in Finland with at least 50% domestic content.

== Design ==
Amphion's approach to speaker-design centers around the concept of preserving sonic coherence. They advocate closed cabinet design in their studio products.

By using a waveguide, Amphion achieves their low crossover point, time-aligns the drivers, and unifies the dispersion throughout a wide frequency band. The low crossover point (1600–2000 Hz) in Amphion products creates a seamless integration between drivers, so the speakers work in a point-source manner. In 2015, Amphion introduced their first bass extension system - the BaseOne25. The bass extensions design transforms a two-way monitor into a full range three-way system. These concepts have since been widely adopted by the industry.

After 24 years, the company introduced its first active studio monitor - the One25A - in April 2023. As with Amphion's passive monitor designs, the One25A achieves the benefits of a pure and short signal path that maximizes dynamics and resolution. The new monitor exemplifies the brand's enduring dedication to advanced acoustic design, and careful component selection, while incorporating the advantages of an active design - such as steep filters and protection circuitry.

Amphion loudspeakers are effective in immersive setups due to their characteristic acoustic design, and ensuring consistent and even sound dispersion between all models. In 2020, Amphion introduced their initial multichannel amplifier - the Amp400.8 - followed by a 12-channel version - the Amp400.12 - in 2023.

== Reception ==
Approximately 90–95% of Amphion's production is distributed to international markets. Audiophiles, professionals, and design enthusiasts around the world have embraced Amphion's products for their ability to deliver a captivating and authentic listening experience. They are used in multiple audio industries such as music, post production, gaming, broadcast, streaming, and live-event. The studio monitors are used by many sound professionals around the world including Finneas O'Connell, Mike Dean, Humberto Gatica as well as the organisations NHK, NCPA and Onkio Haus.

== See also ==
- List of studio monitor manufacturers
- List of loudspeaker manufacturers
