= Rectilinear Research Corporation =

Now defunct manufacturer of high-end loudspeakers

- Industry: Loudspeaker manufacturers
- Founded: 1966 (est.)
- Founder: Morris I. Wiener
- Defunct: 1977-8
- Headquarters: Brooklyn and Bronx, New York
- Key people: Arnold Schwartz, James Bongiorno, Marty Gersten, Jon Dahlquist, Richard Shahinian
- Products: Loudspeaker

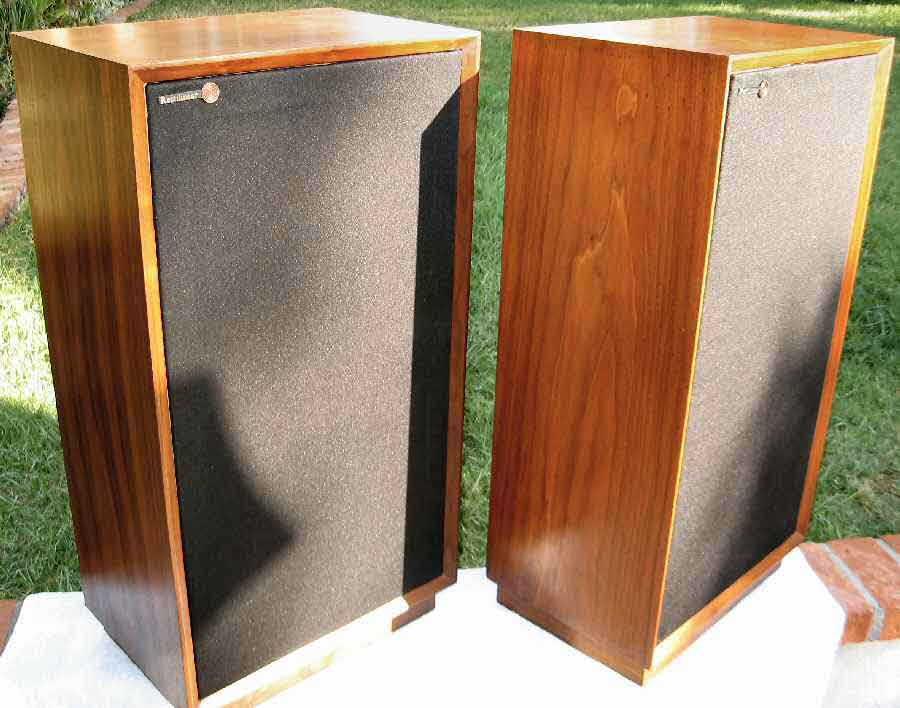
Rectilinear III "Highboy"

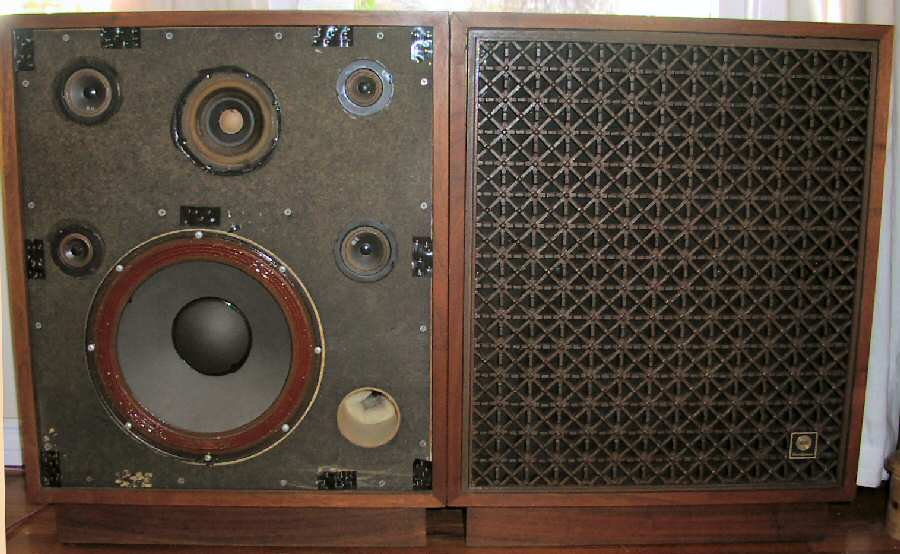
Rectilinear III Lowboy

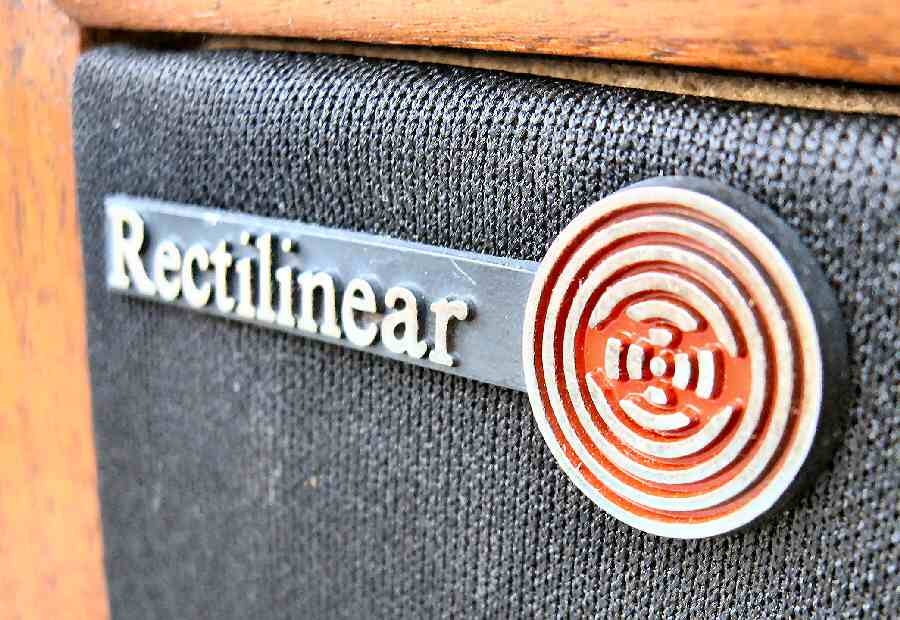
Rectilinear III (and others) grille emblem

Rectilinear III "Lowboy" (and others) grille emblem

Rectilinear Research Corporation was a manufacturer of loudspeakers. The company was formed around 1966 and its principal was Morris I. Wiener (alt. sp. "Weiner") of Plandome Manor, New York. Arnold Schwartz, James Bongiorno, Marty Gersten, Jon Dahlquist, and Richard Shahinian were at different times and at different stages working with the company as engineers to develop speaker models.

The first main office location for the company (1966–68) was at 30 Main Street, Brooklyn, New York. Some time around 1968, the company moved headquarters, manufacturing, assembly, and service center to 107 Bruckner Blvd (E 133rd St.) in the Bronx. The company remained at this address until it was shuttered in 1977–8.

The company launched its first model, the Rectilinear III, in 1966. This model, received positive reviews by audio journalists, including Stereo Review, Popular Electronics, Buyer's Guide Magazine, and Stereo & Hi-Fi Times. Three of the company's print advertisements were illustrated by the artist Rick Meyerowitz and ran in publications such as Rolling Stone, National Lampoon, and others in 1973 and 1974.

Although formally this model always carried the name "III", it was colloquially often nicknamed the "Highboy" following the launch of the "III Lowboy" (around 1970) in order not to confuse the two models. Both the III "Highboy" and III Lowboy are pictured here.

By 1971, Rectilinear had expanded its product range to include the following speaker models (MSRP prices per speaker):

- III (3-way, six drivers) - 35x18x12" - $279
- III Lowboy (3-way, six drivers) - 28x22x12" - $299
- Mini III (3-way) - 19x12x10" - $100
- VI (3-way, six drivers) - 25x14x11" - $239 (discontinued by 1971)
- Xa (3-way) - 25x14x11" - $199
- XI (2-way) - 23x12x11" - $80
- XII (3-way) - 25x14x11" - $139

Some of these early 3-way models featured 10" and 12" woofers manufactured by Jensen ("Flex-Air") and CTS (Chicago Telephone Supply), 5" whizzer cone squawkers manufactured by Philips Electronics of the Netherlands, and 2" and 2.5" cone tweeters by Peerless of Denmark. The Rectilinear speakers were typically, but not always, of ported design and finished in walnut with fabric or fretwork grilles. Many models featured one, or sometimes two, rear tone controls. The company offered some of their models as kits and "semi-kits".

Later models (1971 - approx. 1977) include:

- 2
- 4
- 4.5
- 5
- 7 (high output fuse version "MTH 4" also available)
- 7A
- IIIa
- IIIb
- X
- XIa
- XIb

The company also produced a tilted speaker stand, the "Rectilinear Dispersion Base", intended to be used with the Model 5 speaker.

Although the Rectilinear speakers were distributed through a nationwide network of up to 400 dealers, most of their sales was generated on the East Coast. Distributor in Canada was H Roy Gray Ltd., 14 Laidlaw Blvd., Markham, Ontario. International and military sales were offered by Royal Sound Co., 409 North Main St., Freeport, New York.
