= BassBoss =

American audio equipment manufacturer

BASSBOSS
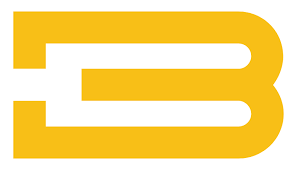
- Company type: Loudspeaker Manufacturer
- Industry: Professional audio
- Founded: 1999; 27 years ago
- Headquarters: Austin, Texas, United States
- Key people: David Lee (Designer)
- Products: Loudspeakers, Subwoofers
- Website: www.bassboss.com

BASSBOSS (formerly BASSMAXX) is an American manufacturer of loudspeakers and subwoofers. While they specialize in powered speakers for live sound, their products are also used in some recording studios.

== History ==
BASSBOSS was founded in 1999 by Johan van Zyl and chief designer David Lee. Lee began his career in the high-end home high fidelity audio and car audio industry when he was 19 years old. His exposure to home audio systems and club sound inspired him to envision the clarity and accuracy of hi-fi systems at the scale and volume of a nightclub. Lee worked towards this vision by installing and designing hundreds of club audio systems in the mid-1980s.

Johan van Zyl is the designer of MAXXHORN Luminations, a hi-fi loudspeaker brand. Van Zyl, also from South Africa, began designing sub horn loudspeakers in 1988. David Lee and Johan van Zyl met and formed the company Rhino Acoustics in Texas, which became BASSMAXX and later BASSBOSS. Lee stated that their vision is to design smoother sound and enhanced bass for nightclubs.

BASSBOSS originally designed horn loudspeaker subwoofers to achieve high output at low frequencies. However reductions in the size, weight, and cost of audio power amplifiers, as well as demand for deeper frequencies, led Lee to explore other designs. BASSBOSS now develops vented, combination, and hybrid systems to take advantage of these technological advancements and accommodate increasing low-frequency content present in modern music.

After years of designing passive loudspeakers, BASSBOSS pivoted to exclusively selling self-powered and processed loudspeakers. Lee explained BASSBOSS's shift to active loudspeakers as a way to maintain consistency and reliability.

BASSBOSS speakers have been used for Ultra Music Festival since 2003. In 2009, 16 BASSBOSS SP218 Models were paired with a d&b audiotechnik rig featuring 32 J8/J12s, 16 J-Subs, and 24 B2 subs for the main stage. The Bayfront Stage used 16 BASSBOSS X2C "Deuce" models were used with d&b audiotechnik J8/J12 main hangs.

In 2016, BASSBOSS released their VS21 subwoofer, which was the company's first hybrid subwoofer. Also in 2016, BASSBOSS provided sound for the Global Spin DJ Expo Main Stage. From 2017-2023, BASSBOSS used amplifiers from the Italian manufacturer Powersoft for their top boxes; for instance the BASSBOSS AT212-3k used the Digimod 3004PFC2 amplifier. In 2022 they announced their partnership with Guitar Center. The Universal Hip-Hop Museum in the Bronx is planned to open in 2024, containing a "Boombox" featuring BASSBOSS speakers. BASSBOSS also appears at trade shows such as NAMM and DJX as part of their "Demolition" tour.

At the 2024 NAMM Show, BASSBOSS announced their Makara-MK3 Dual 21" Subwoofer and CCM-12 12" coaxial monitor. This was their 25th year attending the NAMM Show.

BASSBOSS products are typically used by Mobile DJs, production companies, and installations in nightclubs and bars.
