= ZR Speaker Lab =

Audio company in Slovenia

- Industry: Hi-End Hand-Made audio
- Founded: 1983
- Headquarters: Slovenia, Europe
- Area served: Worldwide
- Key people: Zvone Raspor (Founder)
- Products: Hi-End, Hand-Made speakers and drivers
- Website: zr-speakerlab.si

A few of ZR Speaker Lab Hand-Made products

Zvone Raspor, the founder of ZR Speaker Lab, holding one of his products

ZR Speaker Lab is a small company based in Slovenia, Europe. It is specialized in production of only high-end, handmade speakers and audio devices. The production is limited.

== History ==
The company was founded in 1983 by Zvone Raspor. He has more than 30 years of experience in audio field. Besides being a speaker constructor and designer, Zvone is also an artist.

== Philosophy and availability ==
The philosophy of the firm is to implement the knowledge gained from the arts into the science of speakers. ZR Speaker Lab products are currently distributed in many countries worldwide, including Canada, the United States of America, Thailand, South Korea, Indonesia and Japan.

== Cooperation with Ground Zero Audio ==
Since 2007, ZR Speaker Lab has been cooperating with Ground Zero. Four speakers in Plutonium-Reference line were developed, which are Plutonium GZPW Reference 18, Plutonium GZPM Reference 100, Plutonium GZPK Reference 180 and Plutonium GZPT Reference 25.
