= Duntech =

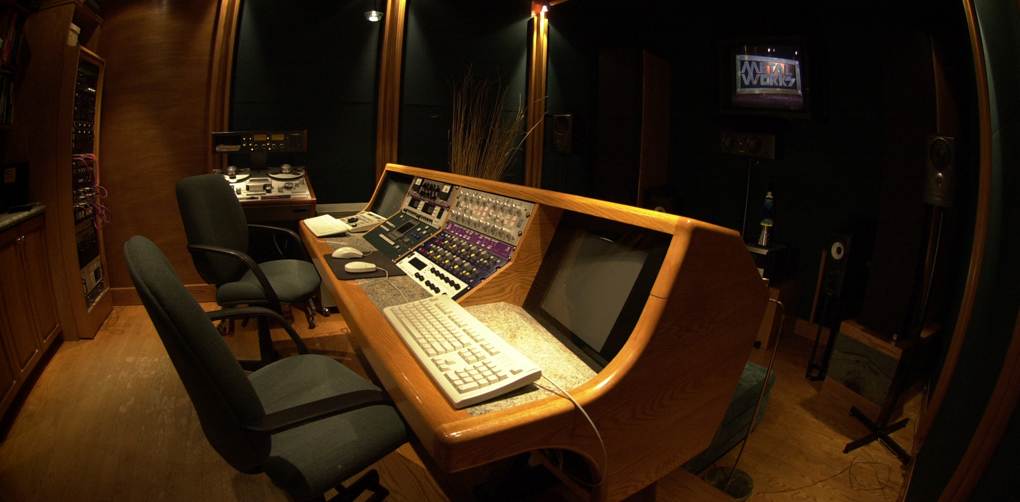
Duntech speakers are used as a reference in mastering suites like this.

Duntech is an Australia-based professional audio loudspeaker manufacturer, researcher, and developer. Their speakers are considered to be extremely high-end, audiophile-grade speakers, but they come with a very high price tag, as well.

== About ==
The company was started in Australia between 1981 and 1990 by the physicist John Dunlavy. In the 1990s Dunlavy left Australia for Colorado, where he founded Dunlavy Audio Labs.

The New York Times said the Duntech speaker "is distinguished by an extraordinary degree of what might be called sheer musicality."

In 1987 the Duntech Sovereign 2001 cost around $15,000. Additionally, they need a very large room to perform optimally. However, other models range in price from $2000 to $30,000. Duntech Statesman was one of 3 models at the lower end and more affordable.

Duntech's Sovereign model line speakers are known for accurate sound reproduction. The Sovereign C-7000 is a seven driver speaker system with two 12-inch woofers, two seven-inch midrange drivers, two two-inch tweeters, and one 3/4-inch supertweeter.

Kiat Low in 2026 is still the owner of Duntech Audio in Australia and spoke to Not An Audiophile about Duntech Audio, the sale of the brand and the revision of the Princess model for modern listening.
