= ProAc =

British loudspeaker manufacturer

- Company type: Private
- Industry: Consumer electronics
- Founded: 1979
- Headquarters: Northamptonshire, NN13 7BE, UK
- Key people: Stewart Tyler Chairman, Founder
- Products: Loudspeakers
- Website: www.ProAc-Loudspeakers.com

ProAc Limited is a British loudspeaker manufacturing company.

== History ==
The company was reportedly founded by Stewart Tyler in 1979 and registered on 09/05/1988. The brand of ProAc was built on the reputation of his first loudspeaker manufacturing entity, Celef Audio Ltd., which was reportedly founded in 1973, incorporated on 10/09/1975 and renamed to Celef Audio International Limited on 10/12/1985. The Celef name is no longer used for marketing, but still appears to remain the legal and financial entity operating the ProAc brand.

== Reviews ==
1. Tablette - "a speaker that isn't as neutral as the BBC LS3/5a compact monitor, but that does manage to equal or exceed that venerable design in most respects." - Stereophile, April 11, 1984.
2. Studio 100 - "The use of a treble-challenged tube amp is mandatory to hear the Studio 100s at their best." - Stereophile, October 1, 1994.
3. Response 4 - "stunning, world-class performer in every regard. It is well deserving of a Class A recommendation and has become a cherished component of my reference system. I recommend that you do whatever it takes to hear this lovely loudspeaker. It deserves to be compared with any speaker at any price." - Stereophile, March 1, 1994.
4. Response 3.8 - "If a loudspeaker can pull me into the music—as the ProAc Response 3.8 did time and again—I know that it's doing a superb job." - Stereophile, January 10, 2000.
5. Future 1 - "Tactile, transparent, crystalline, and fast without being hard, bright, or analytical, the ProAc Future One fulfills Stuart Tyler's goal of building a loudspeaker with all the desired qualities of electrostatic designs and none of their drawbacks." "that ribbon tweeter had me hearing new stuff in every recording I played. And despite their relatively small size (they're definitely apartment-friendly), the Ones created a big, smooth, detailed, satisfying sound." - Stereophile, October 10, 2000.
6. Response 2 - "stunning product that delivers a quality of sound most audiophile speakers only hint at." - Stereophile, September 10, 2005.

In Episode 048 of Not An Audiophile the Podcast Zoe Tyler-Mardle, daughter of creator Stewart Tyler gave a rare interview talking about the history of ProAc and the newly released model.
