= Sherwood (company) =

Test polaroid of the first human model for Inkel

- Industry: Audio
- Founded: 1953
- Headquarters: Southaven, Mississippi, United States (Sherwood America); Incheon, South Korea (Inkel Corporation)
- Products: AV receivers

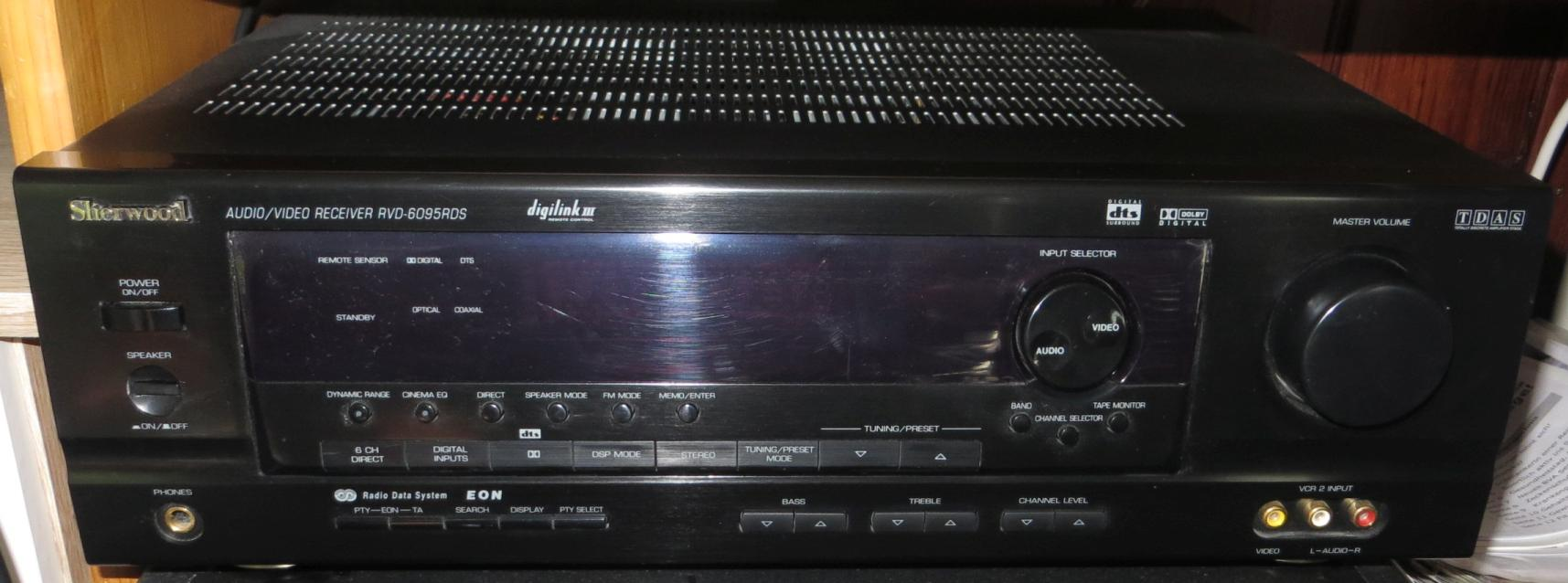
Sherwood RVD-6095RDS Receiver

Sherwood is a South Korean manufacturer of hi-fi equipment.

The company was founded 1953 in Chicago, Illinois, United States, by John Snow and audio engineer Ed Miller.

Since 1980, the company is under Inkel Corporation of South Korea.
