= Studio monitor =

Speaker designed to reproduce sound accurately

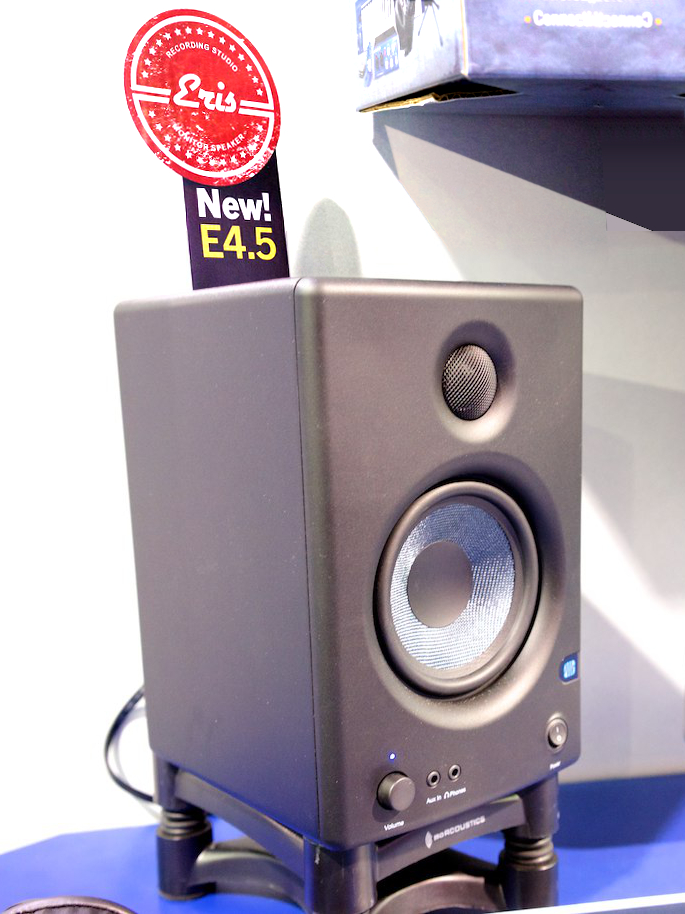
PreSonus Eris E4.5 HD Active Studio Monitor

Studio monitors are loudspeakers in speaker enclosures specifically designed for professional audio production applications, such as recording studios, filmmaking, television studios, radio studios and project or home studios, where accurate audio reproduction is crucial. Among audio engineers, the term monitor implies that the speaker is designed to produce relatively flat (linear) phase and frequency responses. In other words, a studio monitor exhibits minimal emphasis or de-emphasis of sound frequencies. It's meant to provide an accurate reproduction of the tonal qualities of the source audio ("uncolored" and "transparent" are synonyms), with no relative phase shift of particular frequencies—meaning or distortion in sound-stage perspective for stereo recordings.

Beyond stereo sound-stage requirements, a linear phase response helps impulse response remain true to source without encountering "smearing". An unqualified reference to a monitor often refers to a near-field (compact or close-field) design. This is a speaker small enough to sit on a stand or desk in proximity to the listener, so that most of the sound that the listener hears is coming directly from the speaker, rather than reflecting off walls and ceilings (and thus picking up coloration and reverberation from the room). Monitor speakers may include more than one type of driver (e.g., a tweeter and a woofer) or, for monitoring low-frequency sounds, such as bass drum, additional subwoofer cabinets may be used.

There are studio monitors designed for mid-field or far-field use as well. These are larger monitors with approximately 12 inch or larger woofers, suited to the bigger studio environment. They extend the width of the sweet spot, allowing "accurate stereo imaging for multiple persons". They tend to be used in film scoring environments, where simulation of larger sized areas like theaters is important.

Also, studio monitors are made in a more physically robust manner than home hi-fi loudspeakers; whereas home hi-fi loudspeakers often only have to reproduce compressed commercial recordings, studio monitors have to cope with the high volumes and sudden sound bursts that may happen in the studio when playing back unmastered mixes.

== Uses ==
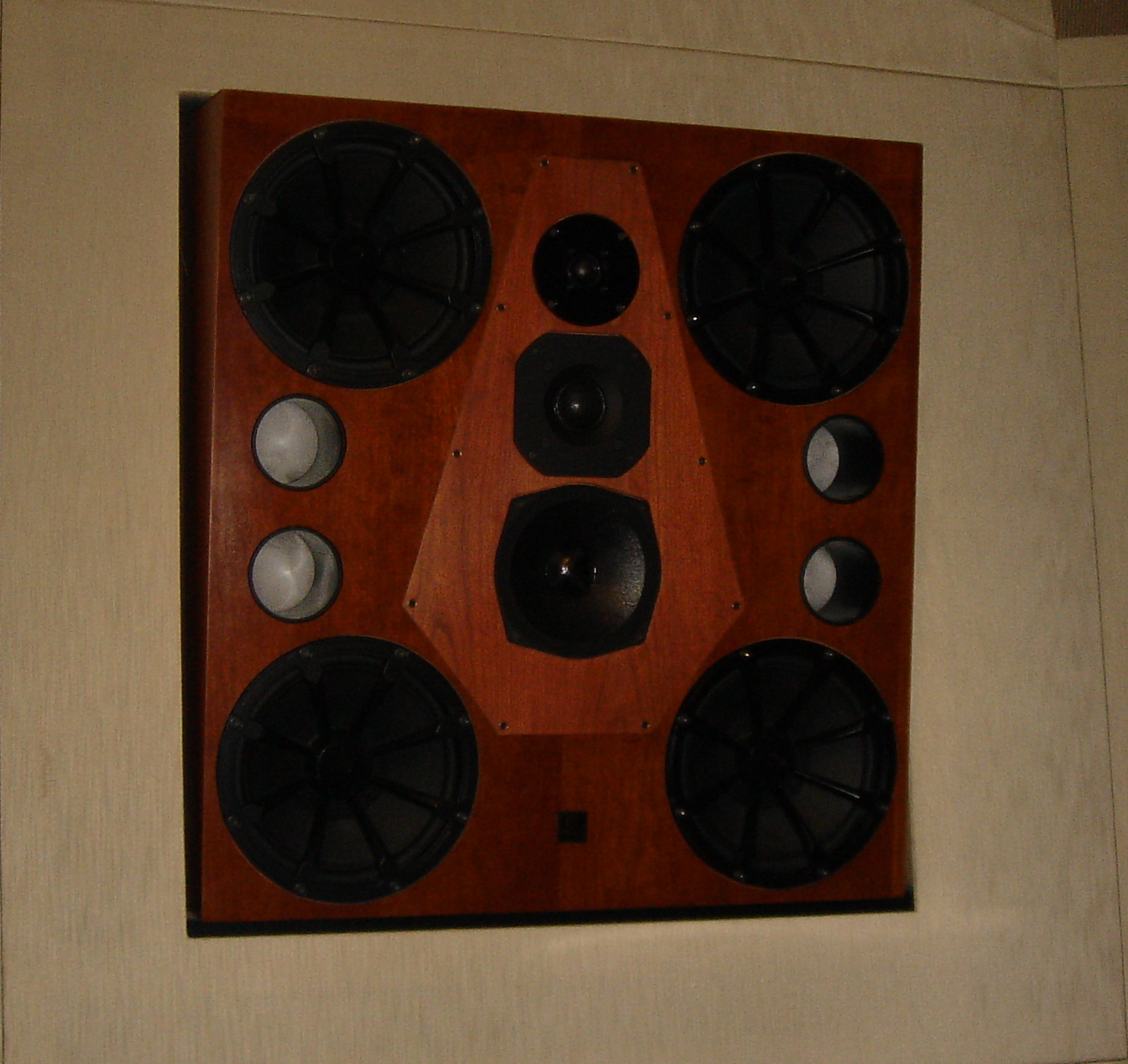
Quested HM412 main monitor, Studio 9000, PatchWerk Recording Studios

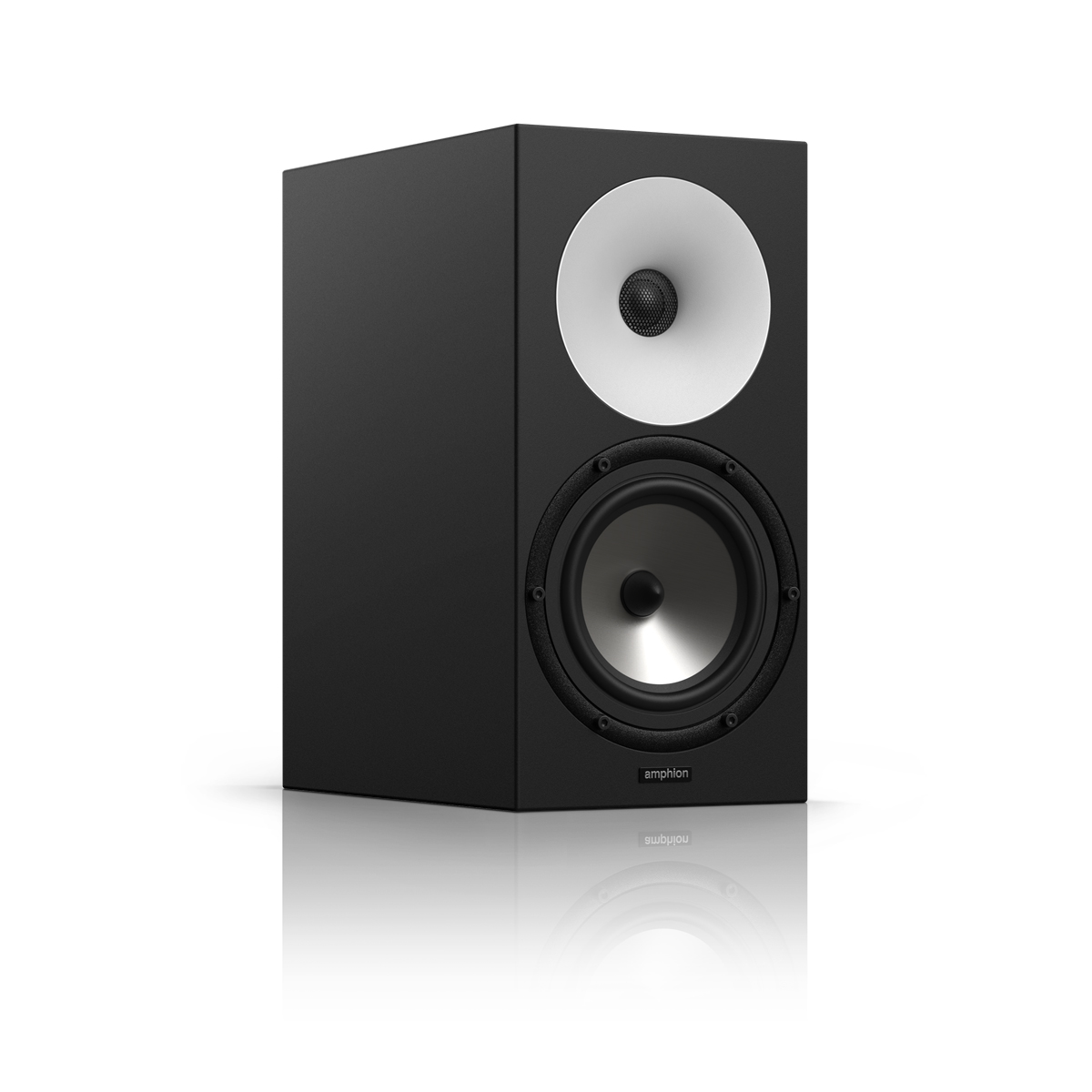
A near-field passive studio monitor by Amphion Loudspeakers

Broadcasting and recording organisations employ audio engineers who use loudspeakers to assess the aesthetic merits of the programme and to tailor the balance by audio mixing and mastering to achieve the desired result. Loudspeakers are also required at various points in the audio processing chain to enable engineers to ensure that the programme is reasonably free from technical defects, such as audible distortion or background noise.

The engineer may mix programming that will sound pleasing on the widest range of playback systems used by regular listeners (i.e. high-end audio, low-quality radios in clock radios and "boom boxes", in club PA systems, in a car stereo or a home stereo). While some broadcasters like the BBC generally believe in using monitors of "the highest practicable standard of performance", some audio engineers argue that monitoring should be carried out with loudspeakers of mediocre technical quality to be representative of the regular systems end-users are likely to be listening with; or that some technical defects are apparent only with high-grade reproducing equipment and therefore can be ignored. However, as a public broadcaster dealing with a lot of live material, the BBC holds the view that studio monitors should be "as free as possible from avoidable defects". It is argued that real life low-grade sound systems are so different that it would be impossible to compensate for the characteristics of every type of system available; technical faults must not be apparent to even a minority of listeners while remaining undetected by the operating staff. It is further argued that, because of technical progress in the science of sound transmission, equipment in the studio originating the programme should have a higher standard of performance than the equipment employed in reproducing it, since the former has a longer life.

In fact, most professional audio production studios have several sets of monitors spanning the range of playback systems in the market. This may include a sampling of large, expensive speakers as may be used in movie theatres, hi-fi style speakers, car speakers, portable music systems, PC speakers and consumer-grade headphones.

Amplification: Studio monitors may be "active" (including one or more internal power amplifier(s)), or passive (requiring an external power amplifier). Active models are usually bi-amplified, which means that the input sound signal is divided into two parts by an active crossover for low and high frequency components. Both parts are amplified using separate low- and high-frequency amplifiers, and then the low-frequency part is routed to a woofer and the high-frequency part is routed to a tweeter or horn. Bi-amplification is done so that a cleaner overall sound reproduction can be obtained, since signals are easier to process before power amplification. Consumer loudspeakers may or may not have these various design goals.

== History ==
=== 1920s and 1930s ===
In the early years of the recording industry in the 1920s and 1930s, studio monitors were used primarily to check for noise interference and obvious technical problems rather than for making artistic evaluations of the performance and recording. Musicians were recorded live and the producer judged the performance on this basis, relying on simple tried-and-true microphone techniques to ensure that it had been adequately captured; playback through monitors was used simply to check that no obvious technical flaws had spoiled the original recording.

As a result, early monitors tended to be basic loudspeaker cabinets. The state-of-the-art loudspeakers of the era were massive horn-loaded systems which were mostly used in cinemas. High-end loudspeaker design grew out of the demands of the motion picture industry and most of the early loudspeaker pioneers worked in Los Angeles where they attempted to solve the problems of cinema sound. Stereophonic sound was in its infancy, having been pioneered in Britain by an engineer who worked for EMI. Designing monitors for recording studios was not a major priority.

=== 1940s and 1950s ===
The first high-quality loudspeaker developed expressly as a studio monitor was the Altec Lansing Duplex 604 in 1944. This innovative driver has historically been regarded as growing out of the work of James Bullough Lansing who had previously supplied the drivers for the Shearer Horn in 1936, a speaker that had rapidly become the industry standard in motion-picture sound. He had also designed the smaller Iconic and this was widely employed at the time as a motion-picture studio monitor. The 604 was a relatively compact coaxial design and within a few years it became the industry standard in the United States, a position it maintained in its various incarnations (the 604 went through eleven model-changes) over the next 25 years. It was common in US studios throughout the 1950s and 60s and remained in continuous production until 1998.

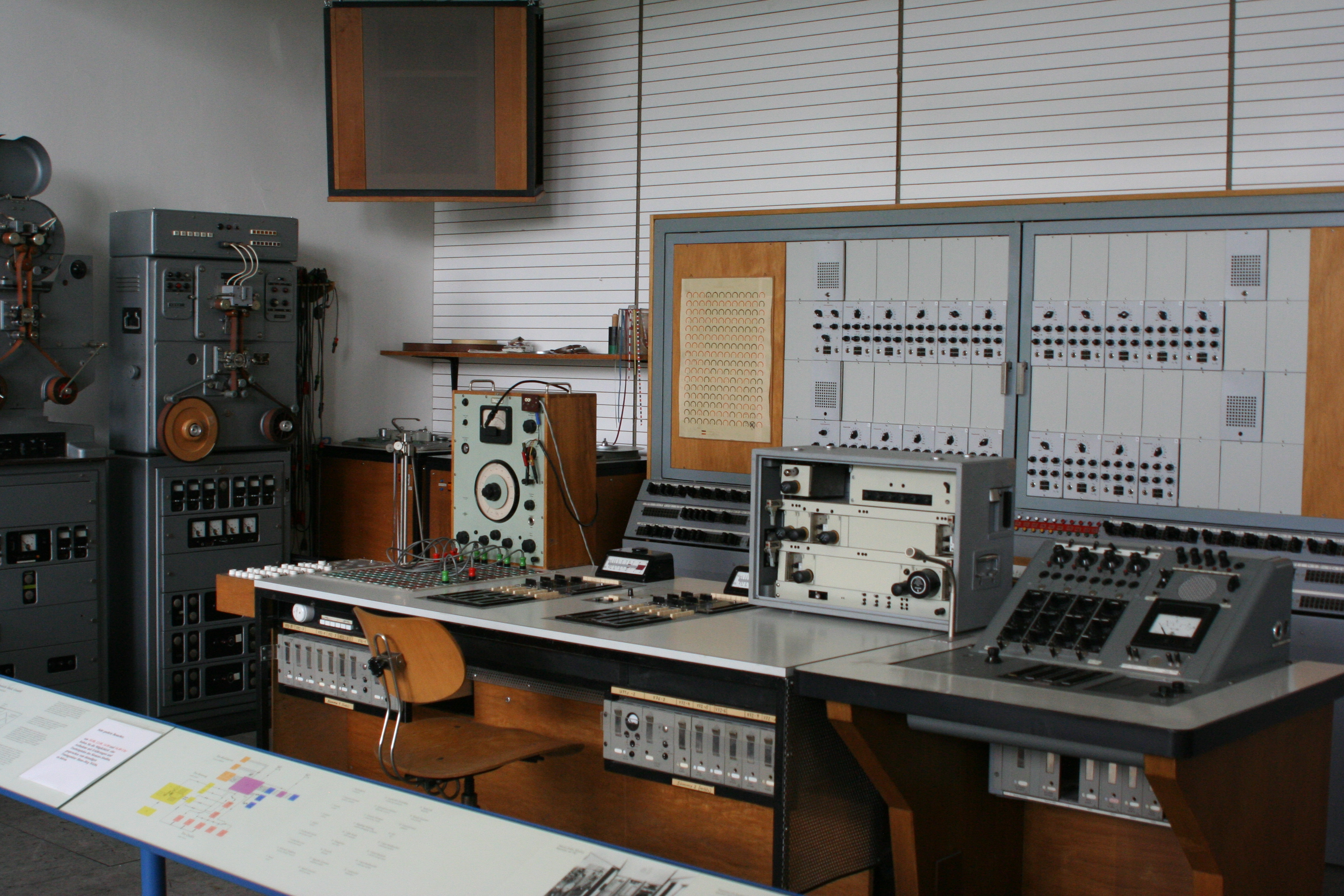
Siemens Recording Studio c. 1956, exhibited in the Deutsches Museum in Munich, Germany

In the UK, Tannoy introduced its own coaxial design, the Dual Concentric, and this assumed the same reference role in Europe as the Altec 604 held in the US. The British Broadcasting Corporation researchers conducted evaluations on as many speakers as they could obtain in around 1948, but found commercial loudspeaker makers had little to offer that met their requirements. The BBC needed speakers that worked well with program material within real professional and domestic settings environments, and not just fulfil technical measurements such as frequency-response, distortion, monitors in anechoic chambers. Above all, the BBC required monitors to sound balanced, be neutral in tone, and lack colouration. Monitor usage in the industry was highly conservative, with almost monopolistic reliance on industry "standards", in spite of the sonic failings of these aging designs. The Altec 604 had a notoriously ragged frequency response but almost all U.S. studios continued to use it because virtually every producer and engineer knew its sound intimately and were practiced at listening through its sonic limitations.

Recording through unfamiliar monitors, no matter how technically advanced, was hazardous because engineers unfamiliar with their sonic signatures could make poor production decisions and it was financially unviable to give production staff expensive studio time to familiarize themselves with new monitors. As a result, pretty well every U.S. studio had a set of 604's and every European studio a Tannoy Dual Concentric or two. However, in 1959, at the height of its industry dominance, Altec made the mistake of replacing the 604 with the 605A Duplex, a design widely regarded as inferior to its predecessor. There was a backlash from some record companies and studios and this allowed Altec's competitor, JBL (a company originally started by 604 designer James B. Lansing), to make inroads into the pro monitor market.

Capitol Records replaced their Altecs with JBL D50 Monitors and a few years later their UK affiliate, EMI, also made the move to JBL's. Although Altec re-introduced the 604 as the "E" version Super Duplex in response to the criticism, they now had a major industry rival to contend with. Over the next decade most of the developments in studio monitor design originated from JBL.

As the public broadcaster in the UK, the BBC had the determinant role in defining industry standards. Its renowned research departments invested considerable resources in determining studio monitor suited to their different broadcasting needs, and also created their own models from first principles. A 1958 research paper identified the sound goal, in a monaural system:

It is assumed that the ideal to be aimed at in the design of a sound reproducing system is realism, i.e. that the listener should be able to imagine himself to be in the presence of the original source of sound. There is, of course, scope for legitimate experiment in the processing of the reproduced signals in an endeavour to improve on nature, however, realism, or as near an approach to it as may be possible, ought surely to be regarded as the normal condition and avoidable departures from this state, while justified upon occasion, should not be allowed to become a permanent feature of the system.

In designing a loudspeaker, the BBC established the compromise that had to be established between size, weight and cost considerations. Two-way designs were preferred due to the inherently simpler crossover network, but were subject to the limitations of speaker driver technology at the time – there were few high-frequency units available at the time that functioned down to 1.5 kHz, meaning that the woofer must operate in a predictable manner up to about 2 kHz. The BBC developed a two-way studio monitor in 1959, the LS5/1, using a 58mm Celestion tweeter and 380mm Goodmans bass unit, but continually had problems with consistency of the bass units. The successful testing of a 305mm bass cone made with new thermoplastics led to development and deployment of the LS5/5 and LS5/6 monitors that occupied only 60% volume of its predecessor.

As recording became less and less "live" and multi-tracking and overdubbing became the norm, the studio monitor became far more crucial to the recording process. When there was no original performance outside what existed on the tape, the monitor became the touchstone of all engineering and production decisions. As a result, accuracy and transparency became paramount and the conservatism evident in the retention of the 604 as the standard for over twenty years began to give way to fresh technological development. Despite this, the 604 continued to be widely used - mainly because many engineers and producers were so familiar with their sonic signature that they were reluctant to change.

=== 1960s and 1970s ===
In a BBC white paper published in January 1963, the authors explored two-channel stereophony, and remarked that it was at a disadvantage compared with multi-channel stereophony that was already available in cinemas in that "the full intended effects is apparent only to observers located within a restricted area in front of the loudspeakers". The authors expressed reservations about dispersion and directionality in 2-channel systems, noting that the "face-to-face listening arrangement" was not able to give an acceptable presentation for a centrally located observer in a domestic setting. The paper concluded:

The achievement of suitable directional characteristics within the aesthetic and economic limitations applying to domestic equipment will however require a much greater research effort than either the corporation or the radio industry have so far been able to devote to the subject.

To complement its larger two-way monitors for studio use, the BBC developed a small speaker for near-field monitoring of the frequency range from 400 Hz to about 20 kHz for its outside broadcasting monitoring. The principal constraints were space and situations where using headphones is unsatisfactory, such as in mobile broadcasting vans. Based on scaling tests done in 1968, and detailed audio work against the LS5/8 – a large "Grade I monitor" already in use at the time – and with live sources, the BBC Research Department developed the LS3/5, which became the famous LS3/5A that was used from 1975 to much of the 1990s and beyond by the BBC and audiophiles alike.

In the late 1960s JBL introduced two monitors which helped secure them pre-eminence in the industry. The 4320 was a direct competitor to the Altec 604 but was a more accurate and powerful speaker and it quickly made inroads against the industry standard. However, it was the more compact 4310 that revolutionized monitoring by introducing the idea of close or "nearfield" monitoring. (The sound field very close to a sound source is called the "near-field." By "very close" is meant in the predominantly direct, rather than reflected, sound field. A near-field speaker is a compact studio monitor designed for listening at close distances (3 to 5 feet (0.9 to 1.5 m)), so, in theory, the effects of poor room acoustics are greatly reduced.)

The 4310 was small enough to be placed on the recording console and listened to from much closer distances than the traditional large wall-(or "soffit") mounted main monitors. As a result, studio-acoustic problems were minimized. Smaller studios found the 4310 ideal and that monitor and its successor, the 4311, became studio fixtures throughout the 1970s. Ironically, the 4310 had been designed to replicate the sonic idiosyncrasies of the Altec 604 but in a smaller package to cater for the technical needs of the time.

The 4311 was so popular with professionals that JBL introduced a domestic version for the home-audio market. This speaker, the JBL L-100, (or "Century") was a huge success and became the biggest-selling speaker within a few years. By 1975, JBL overtook Altec as the monitor of choice for most studios. The major studios continued to use huge designs mounted on the wall which were able to produce prodigious SPL's and amounts of bass.

This trend reached its zenith with The Who's use of a dozen JBL 4350 monitors, each capable of 125 dB and containing two fifteen-inch woofers and a twelve-inch mid-bass driver. Most studios, however, also used more modest monitoring devices to check how recordings would sound through car speakers and cheap home systems. A favourite "grot-box" monitor employed in this way was the Auratone 5C. Beyond approximating limited-bandwidth consumer playback, the single-driver design was valued for its strong midrange emphasis: with no crossover between separate woofer and tweeter drivers, it let engineers judge vocal and instrument balance without the crossover distortion and cabinet resonances that can affect larger multi-driver monitors.

However, a backlash against the behemoth monitor was soon to take place. With the advent of punk, new wave, indie, and lo-fi, a reaction to high-tech recording and large corporate-style studios set in and do-it-yourself recording methods became the vogue. Smaller, less expensive, recording studios needed smaller, less expensive monitors and the Yamaha NS-10, a design introduced in 1978 ironically for the home audio market, became the monitor of choice for many studios in the 1980s. While its sound-quality has often been derided, even by those who monitor through it, the NS-10 continues in use to this day and many more successful recordings have been produced with its aid over the past twenty five years than with any other monitor.

=== 1980s–1990s ===
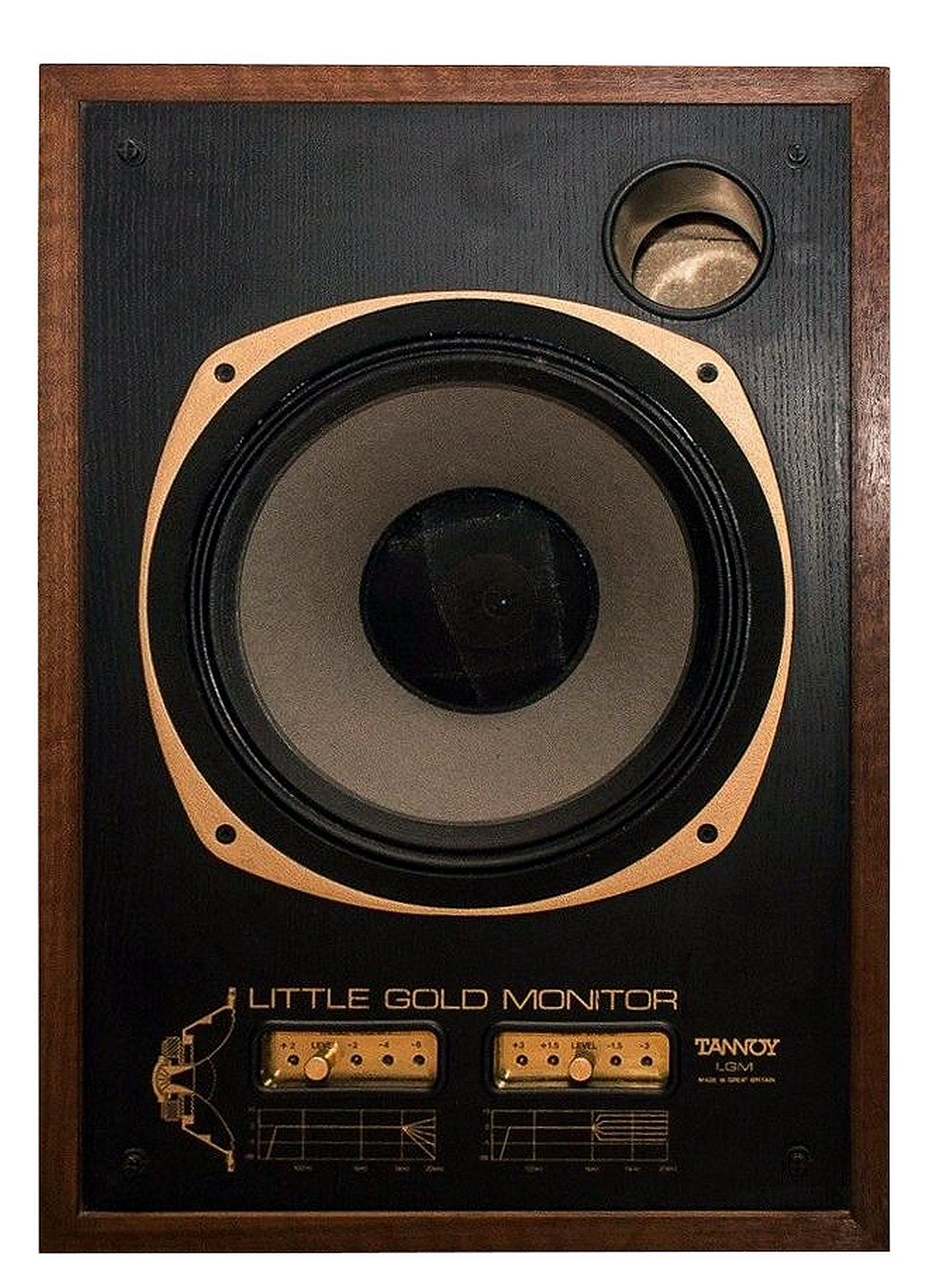
Studio monitor Little Gold Monitor (c. 1990) from Tannoy with two-way-coaxial construction, meaning the tweeter for frequencies from 1.400 Hz and above is located independently in the center of the 30 cm bass driver

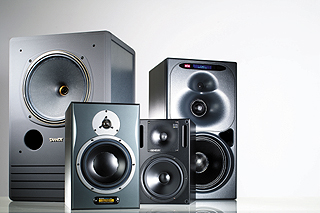
Tannoy, Dynaudio, Genelec, and K+H studio monitors

By the mid-1980s the near-field monitor had become a permanent fixture. The larger studios still had large soffit-mounted main monitors but producers and engineers spent most of their time working with near-fields. Common large monitors of the time were Eastlake / Westlake monitors with twin 15" bass units, a wooden midrange horn and a horn-loaded tweeter. The UREI 813 was also popular. Based on the almost ageless Altec 604 with a Time-Align passive crossover network developed by Ed Long, it included delay circuitry to align the acoustic centers of the low and high-frequency components. Fostex "Laboratory Series" monitors were used in a few high-end studios, but with increasing costs of manufacture, they became rare. The once dominant JBL fell gradually into disfavour.

One of the most striking trends was the growth of soft-dome monitors. These operated without horn-loaded drivers. Horns, while having advantages in transient response and efficiency, tend to be hard to listen to over long periods. The lack of distortion of high-end dome midrange & tweeters made them easy to work with all day (and night). Typical soft-dome systems were made by Roger Quested, ATC, Neil Grant and PMC and were actively driven by racks of active crossovers and amplifiers. Other monitor and studio designers like Tom Hidley, Phil Newall and Sam Toyoshima continued research into the speaker/room interface and led developments in room design, trapping, absorption and diffusion to create a consistent and neutral monitoring environment.

=== 2000s ===
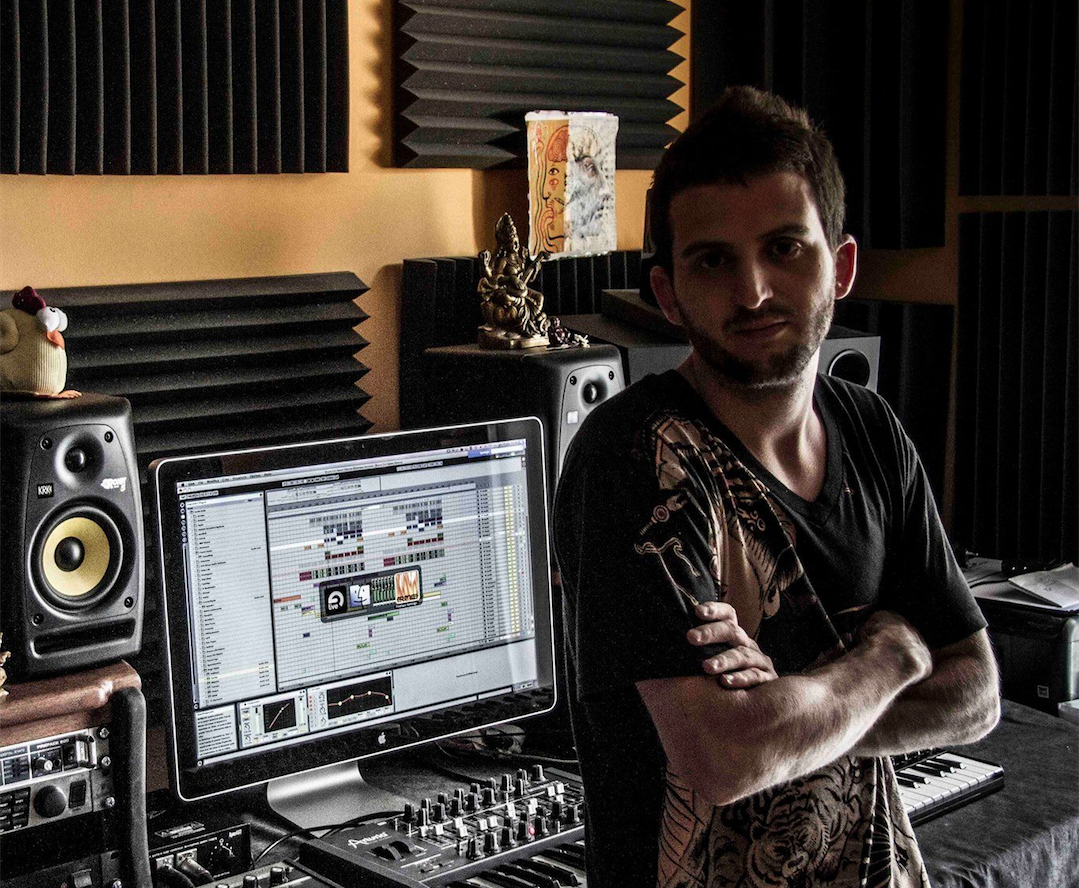
Bruce Gil in a mastering studio (A near-field studio monitor can be seen on the left.)

The main post-NS-10 trend has been the almost universal acceptance of powered monitors where the speaker enclosure contains the driving amplifiers. Passive monitors require outboard power amplifiers to drive them as well as speaker wire to connect them. Powered monitors, by contrast, are comparatively more convenient and streamlined single units, which in addition, marketeers claim a number of technical advantages. The interface between speaker and amplifier can be optimized, possibly offering greater control and precision, and advances in amplifier design have reduced the size and weight of the electronics significantly. The result has been that passive monitors have become far less common than powered monitors in project and home studios.

In the 2000s, there was a trend to focus on "translation". Engineers tended to choose monitors less for their accuracy than for their ability to "translate" – to make recordings sound good on a variety of playback systems, from stock car radios and standard boom boxes to esoteric audiophile systems. As the mix engineer Chris Lord-Alge has noted:

Ninety-five percent of people listen to music in their car or on a cheap home stereo; 5 percent may have better systems; and maybe 1 percent have a $20,000 stereo. So if it doesn't sound good on something small, what's the point? You can mix in front of these huge, beautiful, pristine, $10,000 powered monitors all you want. But no one else has these monitors, so you're more likely to end up with a translation problem."

But it is uncertain just what tools aid translation. Some producers argue that accuracy is still the best guarantee. If a producer or audio engineer is listening to recorded tracks and mixing tracks using a "flattering" monitor speaker, they may miss subtle problems in the mic'ing or recording quality that a more precise monitor would expose. Other producers feel that monitors should mimic home audio and car speakers, as this is what most consumers listen to music on. Still more believe that monitors need to be relentlessly unflattering, so that the producer and engineer must work hard to make recordings sound good.

=== 2010s–2020s ===
Through the 2010s and 2020s, digital signal processing-based room correction became an increasingly common feature of studio monitoring. Manufacturers such as Genelec, whose Smart Active Monitor (SAM) line and Genelec Loudspeaker Manager (GLM) software have offered automatic calibration since the mid-2000s, along with third-party software solutions such as Sonarworks and IK Multimedia's ARC, allowed engineers to measure a room's acoustic response with a calibrated microphone and apply corrective equalization to compensate for room-induced frequency-response irregularities.

== Comparison with hi-fi speakers ==
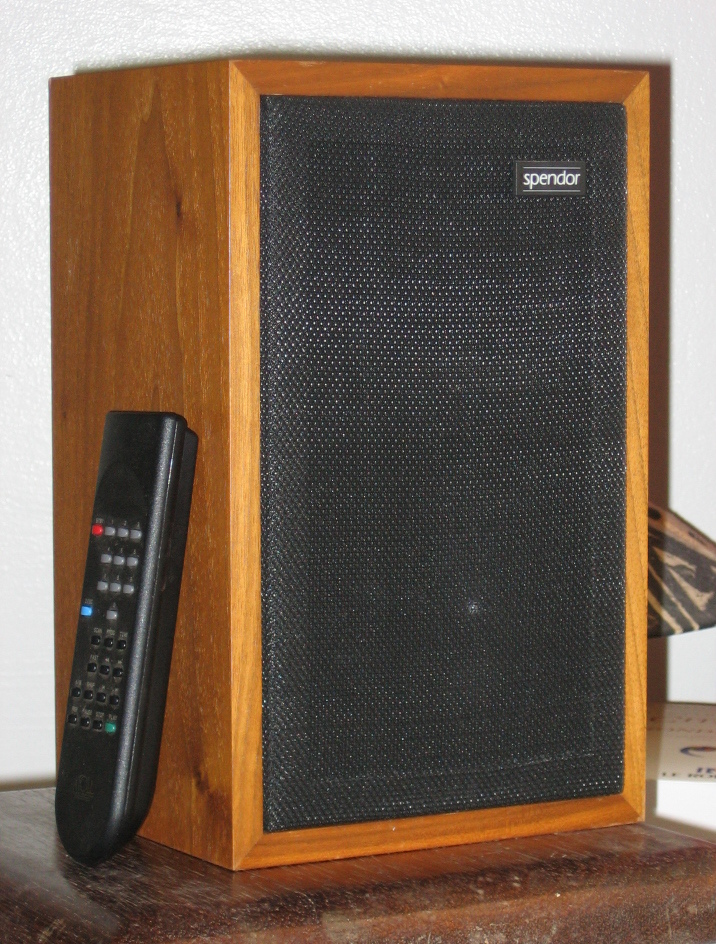
Late model (c. 1998) BBC LS3/5A manufactured under license by Spendor

The defining requirement of a studio monitor is a flat, uncoloured on-axis frequency response across the audio band, so that the loudspeaker reveals rather than flatters the characteristics of the recording. This distinguishes monitors from many consumer hi-fi loudspeakers, which are frequently voiced to produce a subjectively pleasing tonal balance rather than an accurate one.

While no rigid distinction exists between consumer speakers and studio monitors, manufacturers usually accent the difference in their marketing material. Generally, studio monitors are physically robust, to cope with the high volumes and physical knocks that may happen in the studio, and are used for listening at shorter distances (e.g., near field) than hi-fi speakers, though nothing precludes them from being used in a home-sized environment. In one prominent recording magazine, Sound on Sound, the number of self-amplified (active) studio monitor reviews significantly outweighs the number of passive monitor reviews over the past two decades indicating that studio monitors are predominantly self-amplified, although not exclusively so. Hi-fi speakers usually require external amplification.

Monitors are used by almost all professional producers and audio engineers. The claimed advantage of studio monitors is that the production translates better to other sound systems. In the 1970s, the JBL 4311's domestic equivalent, the L-100, was used in a large number of homes, while the Yamaha NS-10 served both domestically and professionally during the 1980s. Despite not being a "commercial product" at the outset, the BBC licensed production of the LS3/5A monitor, which it used internally. It was commercially successful in its twenty-something-year life, from 1975 until approximately 1998. The diminutive BBC speaker has amassed an "enthusiastic, focused, and ... loyal following", according to Paul Seydor in The Absolute Sound. Estimates of their sales differ, but are generally in the 100,000 pairs ballpark.

Professional audio companies such as Genelec, Neumann (formerly Klein + Hummel), Quested, and M & K sell almost exclusively to recording studios and record producers, who comprise key players in the professional monitor market. Most of the consumer audio manufacturers confine themselves to supplying speakers for home hi-fi systems. Companies that straddle both worlds, like ADAM, Amphion Loudspeakers, ATC, Bowers & Wilkins, Dynaudio, Focal/JM Labs, JBL, PMC, surrounTec and Tannoy tend to clearly differentiate their monitor and hi-fi lines.

== See also ==
- Loudspeaker acoustics
- List of loudspeaker manufacturers
- Digital room correction
- Room acoustics
