= Kundalini Project =

Italian-Argentinian musician/composer

Kundalini Project is the pseudonym and one-man bass music and world music endeavor of Australia-based Italian-Argentinian composer, cinematographer, and video editor Bruce Gil.

== Work ==
Kundalini Project's album Roots of Light was released in 2021, which saw him change direction towards the "world music" genre.

Gil collaborated with Italian rapper Salmo (it) to produce the music from Salmo's certified 2013 Gold single, Killer Game, from Salmo's #1 (in Italy) album, Midnite (it). As of Nov 2021, the YouTube video for Killer Game has over 15 million views.

He also composed the soundtrack to Razi Mohebi's (it) Italian film, Cittadini del Nulla, which won the 2014 Mutti Award at the Venice Film Festival. Gil has also composed other original film soundtracks, such as for the Indonesian documentary, Jihad Selfie.

His song "Facing the Sun" was released by Lounge Masters on Lounge Masters Vibes Vol. 04 in 2012, which received international media publicity.

One of Kundalini Project's music videos which received media attention is the song "Brain Forest".

Bruce Gil also is a cinematographer and has been a video editor for the TV series Chasing Zephyr.

To date, Kundalini Project has recorded three albums, Beautiful Sounds Pt. 1, Ancient Rituals, and Roots of Light, three EPs, and several singles. In addition, under his real name Bruce Gil, he has composed and recorded three original film soundtracks, along with two EPs and several singles.
