= Oswalds Mill Audio =

Oswalds Mill Audio (OMA)
- Industry: Audio Electronics
- Founded: 2007
- Founder: Jonathan Weiss
- Headquarters: Fleetwood, Pennsylvania, United States
- Products: Loudspeakers, amplifiers, turntables, audio accessories
- Website: https://oswaldsmillaudio.com/

Oswalds Mill Audio (OMA) is an American lifestyle company that designs and manufactures high-end audio equipment for the home. OMA was founded in 2007, in New Tripoli, Pennsylvania by the filmmaker Jonathan Weiss. In addition to horn loudspeakers, OMA also manufactures amplifiers, turntables, tonearms, and accessories.

== Overview ==
Oswalds Mill Audio is well known in the audio industry for their incorporation of vintage sound technologies in their product designs, such as the rare conical horn profile and field coil drivers. OMA is the only high end audio company manufacturing conical profile horn loudspeakers today. OMA developed out of the infamous “Oswalds Mill Tube and Speaker Tasting”, a yearly event held in the 18th-century mill owned by Weiss in New Tripoli, PA. The first OMA loudspeaker was commissioned by the photographer and filmmaker Anton Corbijn. OMA is directly inspired and influenced by the horn-loaded loudspeaker designs pioneered by RCA in the 1930s and 1940s.

In 2014, OMA released the world’s first cast-iron speaker, the Ironic, with each speaker weighing 400lbs. The Ironic is cast with 3-D printed molds and made from hypo eutectic high graphite grey iron. OMA is known in the audio world for their unique approach to sound and design. Due to the use of conical horns, their speakers are much larger than those using curved horns or typical enclosed loudspeakers. The largest speaker OMA manufactures is called the Imperia, a four-way conical horn system measuring 7′ (2.1 m) tall.

== See also ==
- List of loudspeaker manufacturers
- High end audio
- Horn loudspeakers
- Field coil loudspeaker
- RCA
