= PMC Ltd. =

British loudspeaker manufacturer

PMC
- Industry: Loudspeaker manufacture
- Founded: 1991
- Founder: Peter Thomas; Adrian Loader
- Headquarters: Biggleswade, United Kingdom
- Key people: Ollie Thomas (Co-CEO), Tom Loader (Co-CEO)
- Products: Loudspeakers
- Owner: Peter Thomas
- Number of employees: 60
- Website: Official website

The Professional Monitor Company Limited, better known as PMC, is a British loudspeaker manufacturer, established in 1991. The company's products are widely used within domestic settings, professional studios and other hi-fi applications.

The company is one of a handful to have won an Emmy award in recognition of its "contribution to recording excellence".

== History ==
PMC was formed by Peter Thomas (previously of the BBC) and Adrian Loader (previously of FWO Bauch, an audio distributor) in 1990. They produced their first loudspeaker, the BB5-A, which was a large studio monitor. The first production versions were sold to the BBC and Metropolis Studios. The BBC still use the BB5 at the Maida Vale studios, and use other PMC speakers in other locations as well. Metropolis now has around fifteen of them installed at its recording and mastering facility in West London. Notable users of the BB5 include Prince and Stevie Wonder's Wonderland Studio.

PMC was awarded an Emmy Award for their recording work.

== Technology ==
PMC uses "Advanced Transmission Line" technology in all of their loudspeakers. This is a means of loading a drive unit in a cabinet in such a way as to absorb the unwanted frequencies that radiate from the rear of the speaker driver. The speaker is mounted at the end of a folded line within the cabinet, which is lined with foam of varying absorbency. The lowest frequencies are allowed to pass through the line and emerge in phase from a vent on the front or rear face of the cabinet, in effect acting as a second bass driver. By absorbing the unwanted bass frequencies, the upper bass and midrange are not masked by harmonic distortion.

The ATL design enables the speakers to produce higher sound pressure levels and deeper bass extension than is possible with similar sized speakers using either ported or sealed cabinets. The speakers can also be played at lower volumes without any loss of frequency response.

== Products ==
PMC manufactures products for both hi-fi and studio use. The hi-fi products originally grew out of the studio designs. The company also makes a range of on-wall/in-wall speakers called the ci series. These also use the folded transmission line and are voiced identically to the traditional box speakers.

== See also ==
List of studio monitor manufacturers
