= D&b audiotechnik =

German audio technology manufacturer

d&b audiotechnik
- Type: Professional Audio Manufacturer
- Industry: Professional audio
- Founded: 1981
- Headquarters: Backnang
- Key people: Jaakko Kaivonen, CEO
- Products: Loudspeakers, amplifier/signal processing
- Number of employees: 800
- Website: www.dbaudio.com

d&b audiotechnik is a German loudspeaker and amplifier manufacturer, founded in 1981, located in Backnang, north of Stuttgart. d&b is an international company with subsidiaries in Europe, America and Asia. Their products are produced in Germany. d&b equipment is mainly used in the rental and installation markets.

Jaakko Kaivonen has been CEO since January 2026.

== Milestones ==
=== 1981-1990 ===
April 18, 1981 - d&b audiotechnik is registered as a business in Korb near Stuttgart by Jürgen Daubert and Rolf Belz

1985 - The first complete product line

1988 - The 1220 system is d&b's entry into the installation market.

1989 - The company moves to Backnang. Their first overseas offices are opened in Great Britain and Scandinavia.

=== 1991-2000 ===
1996 - The company opens its first office in Italy

1997 - d&b audiotechnik begins using digital signal processing technology

1998 - An office in United States is opened

1999 and 2000 - Offices in Japan, France and Spain are opened, construction begins on a second factory on the same premises.

=== 2001-2011 ===
2003 - d&b launch the Q-Series and the D12 amplifier.

2004 - d&b audiotechnik launches the Cardioid Subwoofer Array and the ROPE C software to provide central control and monitoring of the systems.

2006 - The launch of the J-Series

2007 - Launch of the R1 Remote control software

2008 - A new office building and factory opens

2010 - Launch of the T-Series

=== 2011-Present ===
2014 - d&b launches its first column loudspeakers, xC-Series

2015 - d&b launches ArrayCalc V8 simulation software, featuring ArrayProcessing software

2017 - d&b Soundscape [DS100 Signal Engine + En-Scene and En-Space software] was launched

2018 - The GSL line-array system from the SL-Series was launched

2019 - The A-Series was launched

2020 - d&b audiotechnik launches the KSLi system

2021 - d&b announces d&b solutions GmbH & Co. KG, and the acquisition of UK AV provider, SFL Group.

2021 - d&b announces d&b solutions GmbH & Co. KG, acquires UK lighting rental company, Whitelight.

2025 - d&b introduces CCL (Compact Cardioid Line Array) in January, followed by the CCLi for installed applications in fall

2025 - In December 2025, it was announced that d&b audiotechnik would acquire the ARVA Group, a Nordic supplier of professional audio equipment with operations in Sweden, Denmark, Norway, and Finland.

2026 - January marked the introduction of U-Series, a family of point source loudspeakers, available as passive and networked variants.
