= PSB Speakers =

Canadian loudspeaker manufacturer

PSB Speakers is a Canadian loudspeaker company founded in 1972 by Paul Barton. The company is named after Barton and his wife Sue. The company is headquartered in Pickering, Ontario, and is now part of the Lenbrook Group.

PSB Speakers produces many lines of speakers from the high-end Platinum series to the entry-level Alpha series. Their speakers are respected by audiophiles who prefer a flat frequency response curve.

Paul Barton has spent a lot of time during the past few decades researching his speakers in the anechoic chambers at the National Research Council in Ottawa.

PSB speakers are currently sold in more than 70 countries around the world. PSB products are distributed in U.S. by Lenbrook America.

In September 2016, the company introduced three new CustomSound in-ceiling speakers.
