= Genelec =

Finnish manufacturer of loudspeakers

Genelec Oy
- Type: Private limited company (Osakeyhtiö)
- Industry: Professional audio Consumer electronics
- Founded: 17 February 1978; 48 years ago in Helsinki, Finland
- Founders: Ilpo Martikainen; Topi Partanen
- Headquarters: Iisalmi, Finland
- Area served: Worldwide
- Key people: Siamäk Naghian (CEO)
- Products: Active loudspeakers and subwoofers
- Revenue: ▲51.9 million € (2022)
- Operating income: ▲12.3 million € (2022)
- Net income: ▲11.5 million € (2022)
- Number of employees: 210 (2022)
- Website: www.genelec.com

Genelec Oy is a manufacturer of active loudspeaker systems based in Iisalmi, Finland. It designs and produces products for professional studio recording, mixing and mastering applications, broadcast, and movie production. The company was co-founded by the late Ilpo Martikainen (1947–2017) and Topi Partanen in 1978.

== History ==
=== Early history ===
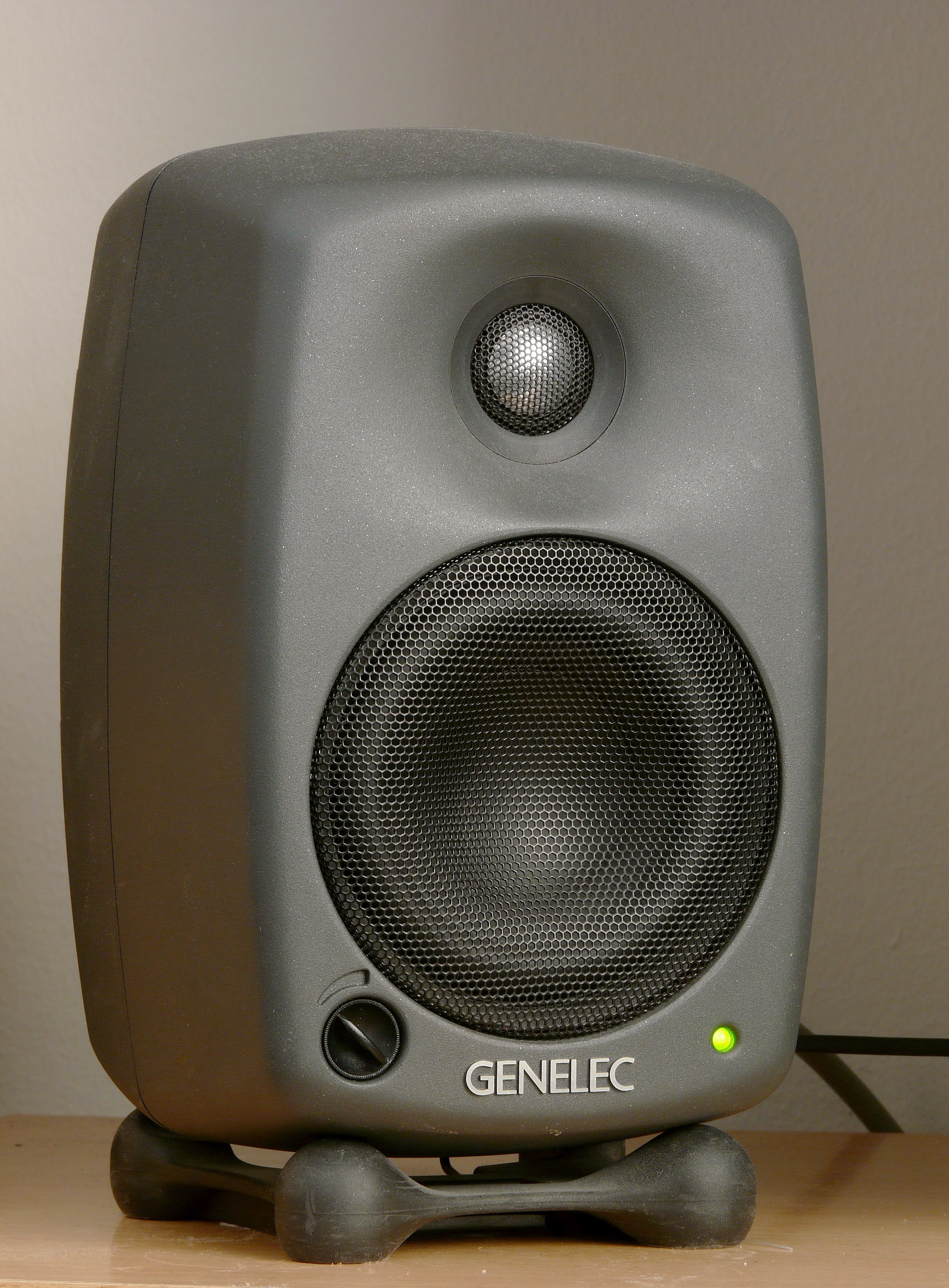
Genelec 8020A

Genelec began operations to meet the needs of Finland's national public-broadcasting company YLE. YLE was building a new radio house in Pasila, Helsinki. Juhani Borenius, who worked for YLE as an acoustician, asked his friends at a postgraduate acoustics seminar if they could make an active monitoring speaker. Ilpo Martikainen and Topi Partanen had the first sample in two weeks. The prototype was promising enough to raise serious interest. In 1978, after two years of research and development, the company opened for business with their first speaker, the S30. The company moved immediately from Helsinki to Iisalmi, in the center of Finland. The first facilities were in Satamakatu, 190 square metres (2,000 sq ft) in the basement of an apartment building where Martikainen lived.

The first order went to RAI in Italy, the second to YLE in Finland. Four people worked for the company at the time, so YLE's order for 340 pieces gave work for one year. The company also began providing sound reinforcement contracting services.

Sound reinforcement contracting was half of the business. Genelec installed systems in many drama theatres in Finland—including the National Theatre, city theatres in Rovaniemi and Kuopio, the congress hall of the new cardiologic hospital in Moscow, the Moscow Circus, and two recording vans for YLE. The last contract job was Tampere Hall and the last audio system supplied went to the Royal Opera in Madrid.

The decision to quit the sound reinforcement business in 1989 was crucial for the future of Genelec. There was no financial need to leave contracting, but the company wanted to be known as a manufacturer.

Every year production quantities grew, as did the number of employees. In 1981 Genelec delivered active monitors to ZDF’s new control rooms in Mainz. The facilities in Satamakatu became too small. In 1983, Genelec moved to a lot next to lake Porovesi at Luuniemi.

=== International business ===
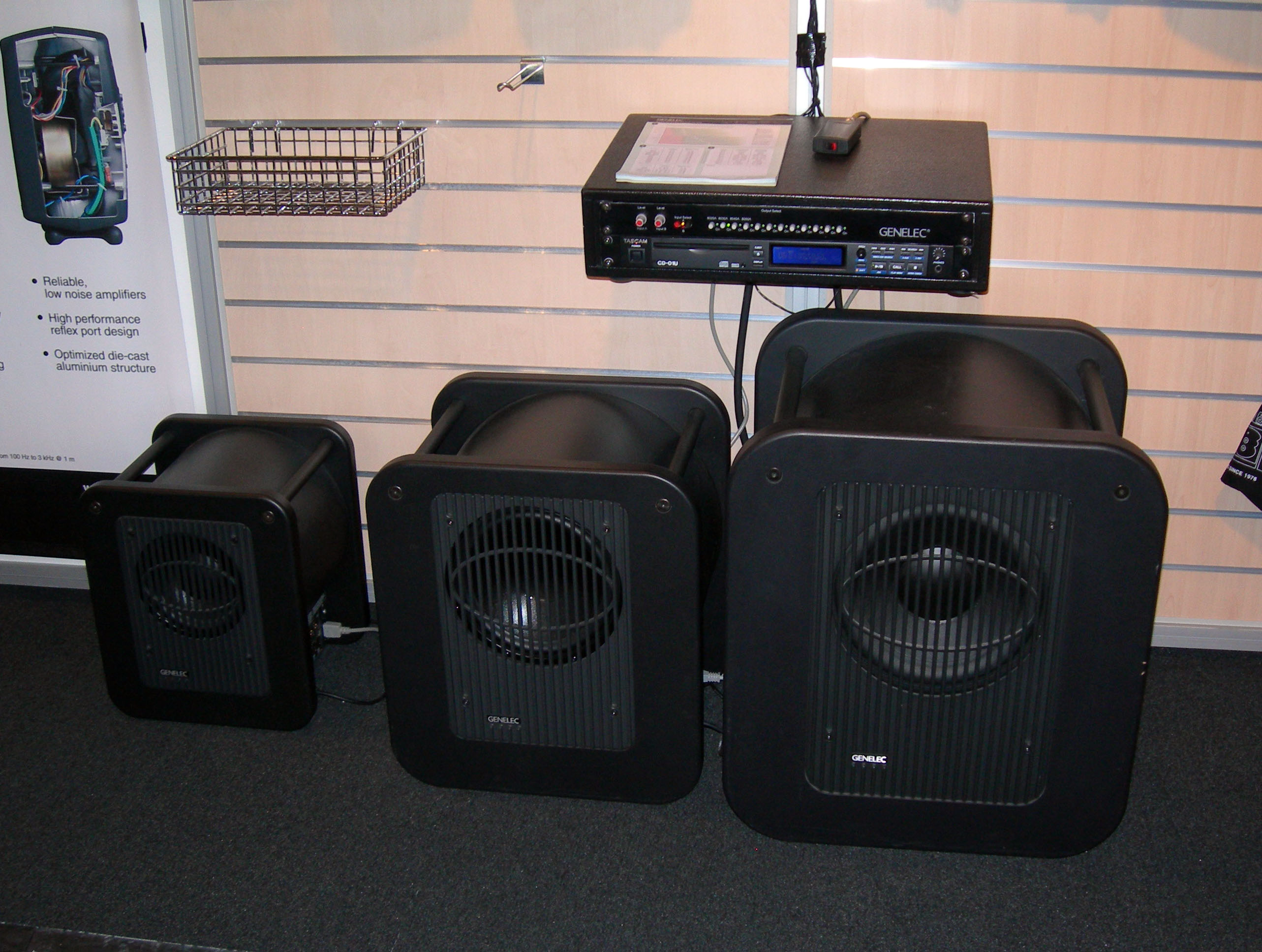
Genelec active subwoofers: 7050B, 7060B, 7070B

The export of speakers has increased exports over the years. In 1980, Genelec exported 20% of production, in 1984 80%, and on into the 1990s exports peaked at 95%. In 2000's export of Genelec has settled around 90%. The first export countries were Italy, the Nordic countries, Federal Republic of Germany, the Netherlands, Austria, and Great Britain. In 1986 Japan was added.

As the export trade has grown, the degree of domestic added value of the products has remained around 80%. The 77th AES convention in Hamburg in 1985 was a turning point for Genelec. They introduced the 1022A and displayed a whole family of speakers: Biamp 1019A mini monitor, broadcasting monitors S30 and 1022A, and music monitors 1024B and 1025A. By 1985, Genelec produced 12 models. They also made sound reinforcement and passive Hi-Fi speakers for the domestic market. The passive Biway 1050A and Triway 1051A were in production in 1980–1982 and production of the small 1049A began in 1988. They have long since discontinued production of passive hi-fi speakers.

In the 1990s, Genelec was increasingly known as a manufacturer of active monitoring speakers. They designed new products, notably the large control Room Monitors 1035A, 1034A and 1033A between 1988 and 1990. In 1991 Genelec designed the 1031A, which was inducted into the TECnology Hall of Fame in 2014. Genelec followed the 1031A with the 1030A, 1032A, 1029A, 1037A, and 1038A, and subwoofers 1091A, 1092A and 1094A.

=== 21st century ===
The first years of the 21st century presented challenges. Genelec introduced the LSE-series of subwoofers and replaced most of the 2-way series with the new 8000 Series. The 8000 Series comprises four models (8020B, 8030A, 8040A and 8050A 2-way Active Loudspeakers), some of which are clearly smaller than their predecessors, which was obtained by using aluminium as the material of the speaker enclosures instead of traditional MDF. Renowned Finnish industrial designer Harri Koskinen designed the 8000 Series' appearance. Adding to the series are the smallest 6010A 2-way loudspeaker and its supporting 5040A Active Subwoofer, introduced in 2008.

Many new Genelec products feature digital signal processing and software control. The 8200 DSP series adds three products to the line (8240A, 8250A 2-way and 8260A 3-way Active Loudspeakers) with ability to automatically adapt their performance to any acoustical conditions with AutoCal calibration through the GLM Software.

As of 2010, Genelec produced over 50 active loudspeaker models, and numerous modifications and versions of these for specific applications. They also produced software products for acoustic calibration. After finishing sound reinforcement contracting, Genelec concentrated solely on active speakers.

In September 2025, Genelec launched the 8380A SAM Main Monitor, a coaxial-driver main monitor forming part of its "The Main Ones" family. The company showcased the model at Beatcon in Berlin that October, before further appearances at Inter BEE 2025 in Japan and the Tonmeistertagung conference in Germany.

== Awards ==
Genelec won two Technical Excellence & Creativity (TEC) Awards at the NAMM TEC Experience, held on Thursday, April 13, at The 2023 NAMM Show in Anaheim, California.

Genelec won outstanding Technical Achievement in the Production Essentials category for its GLM V4.0 loudspeaker management software. Additionally, FM Design won Outstanding Creative Achievement for its design of the Genelec Immersive Experience Centerin the 37th annual NAMM TEC Awards on June 4, 2022, as part of The NAMM Show.

== Products ==
=== Current products ===
As of June 2023

**Studio Monitors**

- Active Monitors and Subwoofers
  - Active 2-Way Monitors: 8010A, 8020D, 8030C, 8040B, 8050B
  - Active Subwoofers: 7040A, 7050C
- SAM™ Smart Active Monitors and Subwoofers^{[note]}
  - Smart Active 2-Way Monitors
    - 8000 Series: 8320A, 8330A, 8340A, 8350A
    - Audio over IP Series: 8430A IP
    - 1000 Series: 1032C
  - Coaxial Studio Monitors
    - The Ones: 8331A, 8341A, 8351B, 8361A
    - W371A Adaptive Woofer System
  - Main Monitors
    - 1237A, 1238A, 1238AC, 1238DF, 1234A, 1234AC, 1235A, 1236A
    - S360A Studio Monitor
    - The Main Ones: 8381A Adaptive Point Source Main Monitor
  - Smart Active Subwoofers and Woofer Systems
    - 7350A, 7360A, 7370A, 7380A, 7382A

**Home Speakers**

- G Series Active Speakers
  - G One (B)
  - G Two (B)
  - G Three (B)
  - G Four (A)
  - G Five (A)
- F Series Active Subwoofers
  - F One (B)
  - F Two (B)
- Signature Series
  - 6040R Smart Active Loudspeaker

**AV Installation Speakers**

- 4000 Series Installation Speakers
  - 4010A Installation Speaker
  - 4020C Installation Speaker
  - 4030C Installation Speaker
  - 4040A Installation Speaker
- Smart IP Installation Speakers
  - 4410A Smart IP Installation Speaker
  - 4420A Smart IP Installation Speaker
  - 4430A Smart IP Installation Speaker
  - 4435A Smart IP Active In‑Ceiling Speaker
  - 4436A Smart IP Installation Speaker
- Architectural Speakers
  - AIW26B Active In-Wall Speaker
  - 5041A Active In-Wall Subwoofer

=== Retired products ===
Limited-production models are not included. Models shown in bold in the "Replaced by" column are in production as of June 2023.

Studio Monitors

Two-way systems
Model	Produced	Replaced by
1018A Active Speaker	1987–1989	—
Biamp 1019A Studio Monitor	1979–1994	1030A
1029A Studio Monitor	1996–2005	8030A
1030A Studio Monitor	1994–2005	8040A
1031A Studio Monitor	1991–2005	8050A
1032A Studio Monitor	1992–2013	1032B
1032B Studio Monitor	2013–2017	**1032C** SAM™
2029A Digital Active Monitor	1998–2005	8130A
2029B Digital Active Monitor; 2029B-Y Digital Active Monitor	2000–2005	8130A
6010A Active Speaker	2008–2013	6010B
6010B Active Speaker	2013–2014	—
8020A Studio Monitor	2005–2009	8020B
8020B Studio Monitor	2009–2013	8020C
8020C Studio Monitor	2013–2017	**8020D**
8030A Studio Monitor	2005–2013	8030B
8030B Studio Monitor	2013–2017	**8030C**
8040A Studio Monitor	2005–2013	**8040B**
8050A Studio Monitor	2005–2013	**8050B**
8130A Digital Active Monitor	2007–2015	—
8240A SAM™ Studio Monitor	2006–2016	**8340A** SAM™
8250A SAM™ Studio Monitor	2006–2016	**8350A** SAM™
M030 Studio Monitor	2013–2019	—
M040 Studio Monitor	2013–2019	—

Three-way systems
Model	Produced	Replaced by
Triamp 1022A Studio Monitor	1985–1990	1037A
1022B Studio Monitor	1987–1993	1037A
Triamp 1024A Studio Monitor	1979–1986	Triamp 1024B
Triamp 1024B Studio Monitor	1985–1990	Triamp 1024C
Triamp 1024C Studio Monitor	1990–1992	1038A
Triamp 1025A Control Room Monitor	1983–1986	Triamp 1025B
Triamp 1025B Control Room Monitor	1986–1989	1035A
1033A Control Room Monitor	1990–1999	—
1034A Control Room Monitor	1989–1999	1034B
1034B Control Room Monitor	2000–2015	**1234A** SAM™
1034BC Studio Monitor	2000–2015	**1234AC** SAM™
1035A Control Room Monitor	1989–1994	1035B
1035B Control Room Monitor	1995–2015	—
1036A Control Room Monitor	1997–2015	**1236A** SAM™
1037A Studio Monitor	1992–1996	1037B
1037B Studio Monitor	1995–2003	1037C
1037C Studio Monitor	2004–2015	**1237A** SAM™
1038A Studio Monitor	1992–2003	1038B
1038AC Studio Monitor	1998–2003	1038BC
1038B Studio Monitor	2004–2015	**1238A** SAM™
1038BC Studio Monitor	2004–2015	**1238AC** SAM™
1038CF Studio Monitor	2009–2015	1238CF SAM™
1039A Control Room Monitor	1995–2015	—
1238CF SAM™ Studio Monitor	2011–2017	—
8260A SAM™ Studio Monitor	2010–2019	**8361A** SAM™
8351A SAM™ Studio Monitor	2014–2019	**8351B** SAM™
Triamp S30 Studio Monitor; S30NF Studio Monitor	1978–1992	S30B; S30BNF
S30B Studio Monitor; S30BNF Studio Monitor	1990–1992	S30C
S30C Studio Monitor	1992–2001	S30D
S30D Digital Active Monitor	2000–2006	—

Subwoofers
Model	Produced	Replaced by
1091A Active Subwoofer	1996–2003	LSE™ Series (7000 Series)
1092A Active Subwoofer	1994–2003	LSE™ Series (7000 Series)
1094A Active Subwoofer	1994–2003	LSE™ Series (7000 Series)
7050A Studio Subwoofer	2002–2005	7050B
7050B Studio Subwoofer	2005–2018	**7050C**
7060A Studio Subwoofer	2002–2006	7060B
7060B Studio Subwoofer	2007–2016	**7360A** SAM™
7070A Studio Subwoofer	2002–2016	**7370A** SAM™
7071A Studio Subwoofer	2002–2016	—
7073A Studio Subwoofer	2003–2016	—
7260A SAM™ Studio Subwoofer	2006–2016	**7360A** SAM™
7270A SAM™ Studio Subwoofer	2006–2016	**7370A** SAM™
7271A SAM™ Studio Subwoofer	2006–2016	—
SE7261A Digital Active Subwoofer	2007–2015	—

Home Speakers

Two-way systems
Model	Produced	Replaced by
Biway 1049A Passive Speaker^{[b]}	1988– N/A	—
Biway 1050A Passive Speaker^{[b]}	1980–1982	—
6020A Active Speaker	2005–2010	G Two (A)
6040A Active Speaker	2002–2010	**6040R**
G One (A) Active Speaker	2013–2017	**G One (B)**
G Two (A) Active Speaker	2013–2017	**G Two (B)**
G Three (A) Active Speaker	2013–2017	**G Three (B)**
HT205 Home Theater Speaker	1999–2007	—
HT206 Home Theater Speaker	1999–2003	HT206B
HT206B Home Theater Speaker	2003–2015	—
HT208 Home Theater Speaker	1999–2003	HT208B
HT208B Home Theater Speaker	2003–2015	—
HT210 Home Theater Speaker	2000–2003	HT210B
HT210B Home Theater Speaker	2003–2016	—

Three-way systems
Model	Produced	Replaced by
Triway 1051A Passive Speaker^{[b]}	1980–1982	—
HT312A Home Theater Speaker	2006–2008	HT312B
HT312B Home Theater Speaker	2008–2016	—
HT315A Home Theater Speaker	2006–2008	HT315B
HT315B Home Theater Speaker	2008–2016	—
HT320AC Home Theater Speaker	2006–2008	HT320BC
HT320BC Home Theater Speaker	2008–2016	—
HT324A Home Theater Speaker	2006–2016	—
HT324AC Home Theater Speaker	2006–2016	—
HT330A Home Theater Speaker	2006–2016	—

Subwoofers
Model	Produced	Replaced by
5040A Active Subwoofer	2008–2013	5040B
5040B Active Subwoofer	2013–2014	F One (A)
5050A Home Theater Subwoofer	2005–2012	—
5051A Active Subwoofer	2011–2012	F Two (A)
F One (A) Active Subwoofer	2012–2019	**F One (B)**
F Two (A) Active Subwoofer	2012–2019	**F Two (B)**
HTS2 Home Theater Subwoofer	1999–2002	—
HTS3 Home Theater Subwoofer	2001–2003	HTS3B
HTS3B Home Theater Subwoofer	2003–2016	—
HTS4 Home Theater Subwoofer	2001–2003	HTS4B
HTS4B Home Theater Subwoofer	2003–2016	—
HTS6 Home Theater Subwoofer	2003–2016	—

AV Installation Speakers

4000 Series
Model	Produced	Replaced by
4020A Installation Speaker	2010–2013	4020B
4020B Installation Speaker	2013–2017	**4020C**
4030A Installation Speaker	2010–2013	4030B
4030B Installation Speaker	2013–2017	**4030C**

Architectural Series
Model	Produced	Replaced by
AIC25 Active In-Ceiling Speaker	2015–2022	—
AIW25 Active In-Wall Speaker	2015–2022	—
AIW26 Active In-Wall Speaker	2001–2015	**AIW26B**
AOW312 Active On-Wall Speaker	2006–2008	AOW312B
AOW312B Active On-Wall Speaker	2008–2017	—

== See also ==
- List of studio monitor manufacturers

== Notes ==
a. The networked SAM™ (Smart Active Monitor) DSP systems feature automatic calibration to the environment.

b. The passive hi-fi speakers, Biway 1050A and Triway 1051A, were in production only for the domestic market in 1980–1982 and the production of the small Biway 1049A began in 1988. Production of passive hi-fi speakers has since been discontinued and the company has concentrated solely on active loudspeakers.
