= Linn Isobarik =

Loudspeaker designed and manufactured by Linn Products

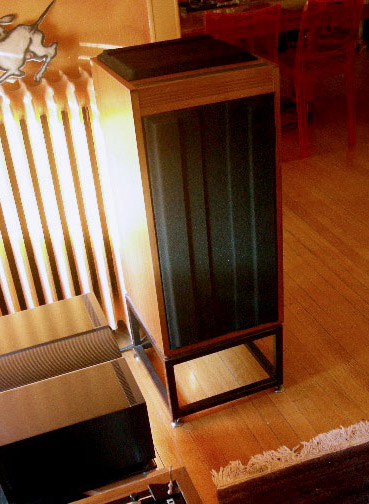
The Linn Isobarik DMS (with in-built crossover) in a domestic setting

The Linn Isobarik, nicknamed "Bariks" or "Briks", is a loudspeaker designed and manufactured by Linn Products. The Isobarik is known for both its reproduction of low bass frequencies and being very demanding on amplifiers.

Launched in 1973, the Isobarik DMS, Linn's maiden and flagship loudspeaker was based on and named for the isobaric loading principle invented in the 1950s. The speaker exists also as the Isobarik PMS – destined for the professional market. Although discontinued in 1992, it remains popular among audiophiles.

== History ==
While other loudspeaker manufacturers sought to outperform each other to produce more quantum bass output from their products, Linn was seeking clear undistorted low frequency bass. Linn theorised a design whose bass could go all the way to DC and be without fundamental resonance. The quest for that extra octave of "dry and extended bass sound" and more accurate reproduction resulted in the Isobarik.

Linn launched the original Isobarik DMS loudspeaker in 1973, the year following the release of its first product, the Sondek LP12. "DMS" is the contraction for "domestic monitor system", and is designed to be driven passively in the home setting – it incorporated a crossover within the loudspeaker cabinet. The Isobarik PMS ("professional monitor system") loudspeaker launched in 1977, destined for the professional market is without the internal crossover. This latter configuration opens up more wiring and driving options, in particular active operation and tri-amping.

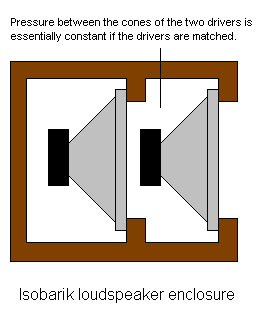
The Linn-patented cone-to-magnet (in-phase) arrangement in a sealed enclosure, as used in the Isobarik.

The Isobarik is so named as it employs the isobaric loading principle invented by Harry Olson in the 1950s: two bass units are mounted in a sealed container and driven in parallel so as to effectively double the speaker enclosure volume and extend its bass frequency response beyond what would be possible for otherwise identical speakers. Linn used a variant of the isobaric principle and patented the use of two bass drive units ("woofers") facing forward in an isobaric arrangement in early 1974.

In 1988, Linn externalised the crossover of the DMS to boards with nominal 4-ohm impedance designed to lie flat at the base of the stands. Upon that change, the original distinction between DMS and PMS disappeared along with the suffix designation. The "DMS" was thus discontinued, although "Isobarik PMS" remained on price lists until the speaker was discontinued in 1992. (Note: From Linn UK retail price list May 2001)

== Speaker ==
Linn brochures dwell little on performance specifications, mentioning somewhat vaguely that the frequency response "varies by only a few db from 20 Hz to 20 KHz with the isobaric loading extending usable bass response to below 10 Hz". Linn also claimed "very low distortion" and "high sound pressure levels", without quantification. Recommended amplifier power rating is in the range of 50–500 watts. Hi-Fi for Pleasure noted that the speakers' impedance, although quoted at 3 ohms nominal, dipped considerably at some parts of the audio spectrum. (Note: normal sealed box system resonance at 31 Hz was present with a cruelly low characteristic at higher frequencies, with dips to 3 ohms, 100 Hz, and 2.3 ohms, 4 kHz. The average value was barely higher than 4, with the 'nominal' value very low at 3 ohm. These results show that the speaker represents a very difficult load to drive and will also be critical of the impedance of both the accompanying connecting cable and amplifier output.) This made the DMS Isobarik very hard for amplifiers to drive, potentially causing many amplifiers' output protection to trip. Equally, the two heavy woofers in each Isobarik made them twice as power-hungry. Such demands happened to make Naim amplification the perfect match because of its high current delivery capabilities and its toleration of near short circuits. The Isobarik was famously used as the acid test for the budget-priced NAD 3020 amplifier at its UK launch. In the 1970s, the DMS Isobarik, available in a number of veneers, sold for £1,000.

As part of their corporate philosophy, Linn intended significant dealer involvement in customer education and decision-making, and included teaching customers how to listen correctly for musical attributes. The trial and evaluation of the product prior to purchase and dealer's expert installation are considered by Linn to be important parts of the value added of their top-end products. As such, no instructions were supplied with the product. The Isobaric PMS retailed at £2,400 including stands in May 1991, and the 4-ohm crossover was priced at just under £500.

=== Design ===
As a three-way loudspeaker system employing six individual drive units, each Isobarik kabinet has two tweeters, two midrange drivers and two woofers. One driver of each frequency range faces forward; a second tweeter and midrange are mounted on the top surface of the enclosure, and one bass unit is hidden from view. While the bass units are isobaric loaded, the midrange is mounted in a terminated transmission line. Crossover points are set at 375 Hz between the woofer and midrange, and 3 kHz between the tweeter and midrange. The upward-firing drivers were designed to aid dispersion and improve the off-axis listening experience.

The Isobarik, like the Sara and Kan that were developed in the 1970s and 80s, was designed to work best near room boundaries. Manufacturer's leaflets advise positioning of the speaker close to a rear wall and approximately 2 to 3 feet (60 to 90 cm) from corners. The trade-off is the less than solid stereo image. Linn declared forthrightly that loudspeakers that were not designed to work tight against a wall were without merit. According to Art Dudley of Stereophile, Linn also maintained provocatively that "anyone who would design, manufacture, buy, sell, or positively review a loudspeaker made to be installed away from room boundaries was a fool".

In early product manuals, Linn recommended using the Isobarik PMS in tri-amped configuration with Naim amplifiers. Three NAP 250 amplifiers, fed by a 3-way Naim electronic crossover, would typically be used, one for each pair of the doubled-up treble, midrange and bass units. From its introduction in 1984, the monaural NAP 135 can be used in a "6-pack" configuration.

After Linn had started manufacturing electronics and upon the release of the Isobarik Aktiv crossover, Linn declared that the 'AKTIV' system comprises: the source components plus one Linn LK1 preamplifier, one Linn Aktiv Isobarik crossover, three Linn LK2 power amplifiers, one pair of Linn Isobarik loudspeakers and the necessary cables.

=== Construction ===
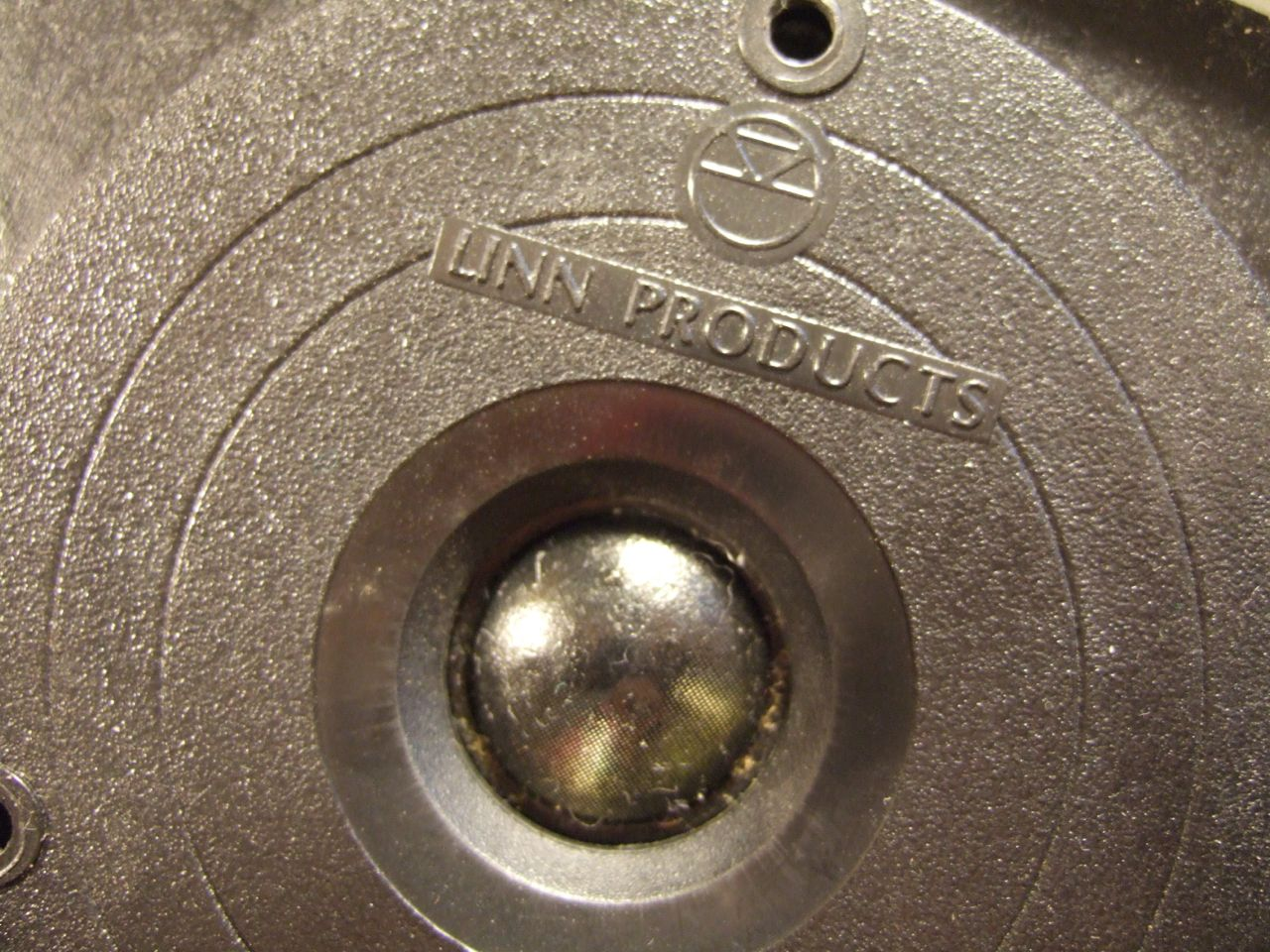
Late Isobarik tweeter, Linn D20-LP-2 with the concentric circles and Linn logo. The D20-LP-1 lacked the Linn Logo, sourced from Hiquphon in Denmark

The loudspeaker cabinet measures 15 × 15 × 30 inches (38 × 38 × 76 cm). The extremely rigid 55-litre cabinet is constructed using 19mm high-density particle board that is strategically damped in places, and extensively braced. According to the manufacturer, there is an array of stressed steel rods inside the enclosure to control energy flows. The techniques employed ensure that energy that would have caused the unwanted motion of the front panel and drivers is cancelled by a similar but opposite energy from the upward facing units, resulting in the minimum amount of resonances. The cabinets were initially made by Linn in their own factory, but the manufacturing was later outsourced to furniture-makers Leon Levin of Glasgow.

Although the speaker uses bought-in drivers, they have been rebuilt using stronger materials. Drivers' metal baskets are treated to reduce the effects of vibration, and the enclosure is designed and constructed to control energy. The drive units (Scan-Speak D2008, Linn Products D20-LP-1 by Hiquiphon, B110 and B139) were sourced from KEF in kit form, and two KEFKIT3 kits were judiciously used for each cabinet. (Note: "LF Unit: B139 Type SP1044; MF Unit: B110 Type SP1003; HF Unit T27 Type SP1032; Crossover: DN12 Type SP1004; Nominal Impedance: 8 ohms; Specific Frequency Response: + or - 3db 35-30,000 Hz measured at 1m on the axis of the HF unit in anechoic conditions; Dividing Frequencies: 400 Hz and 3,500 Hz; Sensitivity: 9.5 watts into 8 ohms produces 96 db at 1 metre in anechoic conditions.") However, Linn found the T27 tweeter too fragile and replaced it with the more robust and better-sounding D2008 from Scan-Speak after a very short run; the Scan-Speak tweeter was later changed to a Linn D20-LP-1, sourced from Hiquphon in Denmark. (Note: hiquphon consider this equivalent to their OW1-92) The midrange KEF B110, known for its use in the LS3/5A BBC monitor, is a 100mm-diameter unit to which Linn applied a layer of doping. (Note: From 1984 onwards, new polypropylene cones of the B110 obviated further doping) The woofer is a KEF B139.

Each unit of the Isobarik cabinet weighs 40 kilograms (88 lb), and is designed to be placed on stands that are 33 centimetres (13 in) tall so that the tweeter is positioned at the listener's ear-level. The speaker is supplied with heavy stands made from welded square cross-section tubing, to which top and bottom spikes are fitted prior to positioning the speaker cabinet.

Input connections are established through 3-pin XLR connectors. Later versions and the PMS version have banana sockets (see image).

=== Product revisions ===
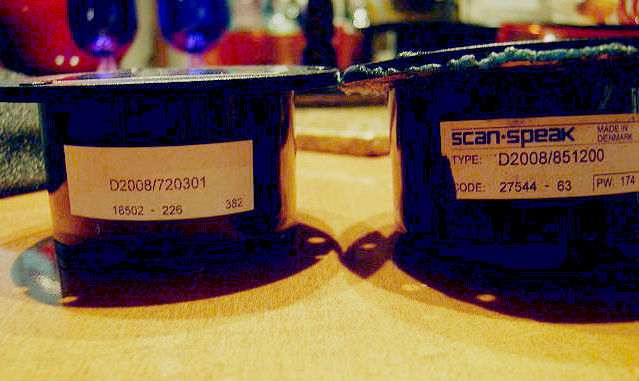
Tweeters taken out of different Isobariks

crossover evolution in the Isobarik

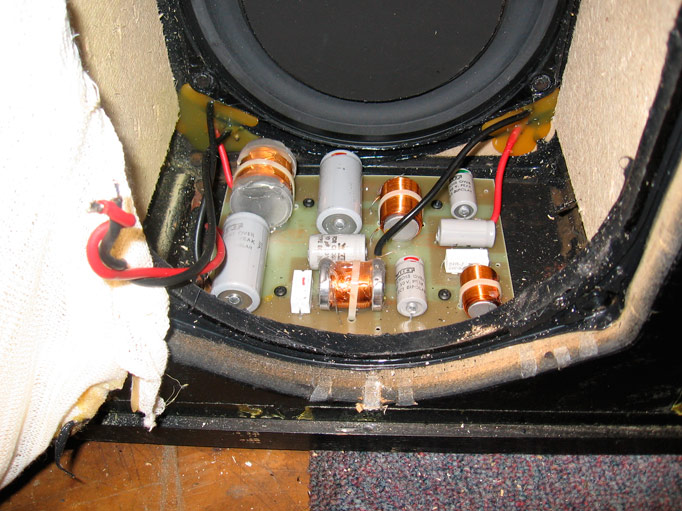
Early version inside isobaric chamber

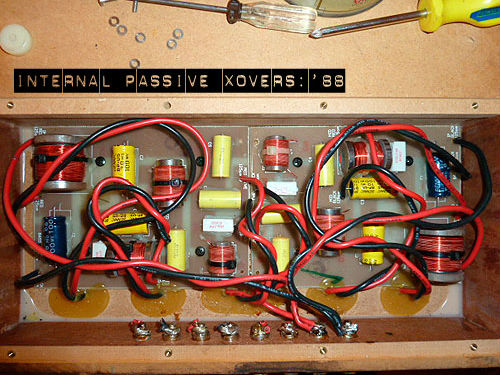
Internal crossover from c.1988 (note: banana sockets)

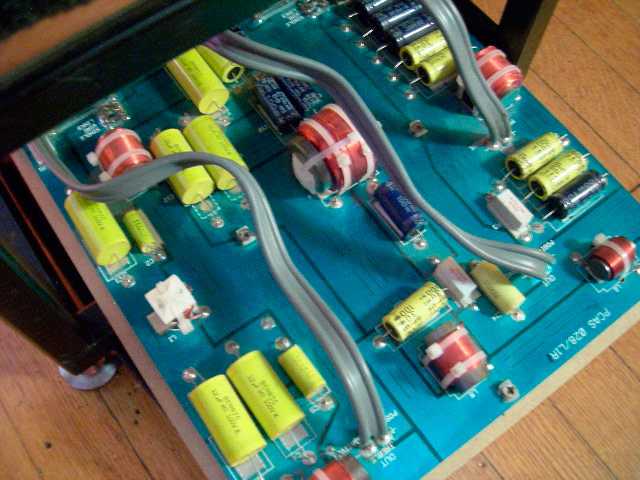
External crossover

- 1973 Isobarik DMS launched.
- 1976 Sep Revised cabinet style.
- 1977 Isobarik PMS launched.
- 1978 Sep Damping: Midrange enclosure and cabinet damping changed. SN. 10283/4
- 1979 The smaller Isobarik Sara launched.
- 1979 Nov Midrange unit: Vented. SN. 10,800/1
- 1980 Feb Treble unit: Scan-Speak treble unit replaced SN. 10,925/6 (Note: The Linn document states replacement in Feb 1980 is a Hiquphon unit. However, this is disputed as Hiquphon seems not to have become supplier until much later – the Hiquphon website lists its founding as 1983. Linn probably did change the tweeters at that date and serial but to another Scan-Speak D2008 with different specifications.)
- 1980 Mar Wiring: common earth at cannon socket. SN. 11,035/6
- 1981 Oct Treble unit: Fitted with t-nuts. SN. 2741/2
- 1982 Jan Cabinet: Changed from chipboard to medite and veneered on both sides. SN. 2859/60
- 1983 Mar Bass/Midrange units: Sound deadening material painted on bass and midrange units. SN. 3000/1
- 1984 May Crossover/Treble units: circuit board with wider tracks and improved layout. New treble units with a smoother response. Linn logo incorporated on front plate. SN. 3939/40
- 1985 Dec Cabinet: improved internal sealing and damping SN. 4825/6
- 1986 Apr Midrange units: harder rubber used for surround. SN. 4953/4
- 1987 Cabinet: Crossover moved to compartment in bottom of speaker. SN. 5575/6
- 1987 Sep Isobarik Sara 9 replaces Isobarik Sara
- 1988 Crossover: New 4 ohm external crossover fitted in stand. Facility for tri-wiring.
- 1988 DMS discontinued – PMS can be driven passively (4 ohm) or actively. SN. 6701/2
- 1989 Isobarik Sara 9 discontinued
- 1991 Dec Speaker: Addition of Ku-Stone ceramic absorber, sealant changed to gaskets from silicone, improved cabinet bracing (non-retrofittable) SN. 8293/4
- 1992 Isobarik discontinued.

Source:Linn

=== Reception ===
The Isobarik loudspeaker has received some polarised opinions, although Hi-fi News noted that the speaker kept its promise by managing to "play the lowest bass guitar notes cleanly and give an impression of unlimited bass extension". The Linn/Naim triamped active system, using a LP12 source, Naim amplification and electronic crossovers together with the Isobarik PMS, was regarded as the pinnacle of "flat-earther" hi-fi systems, and the speaker is integral to the general aura of mysticism that went with the Linn/Naim equipment.

== Other Isobarik products ==
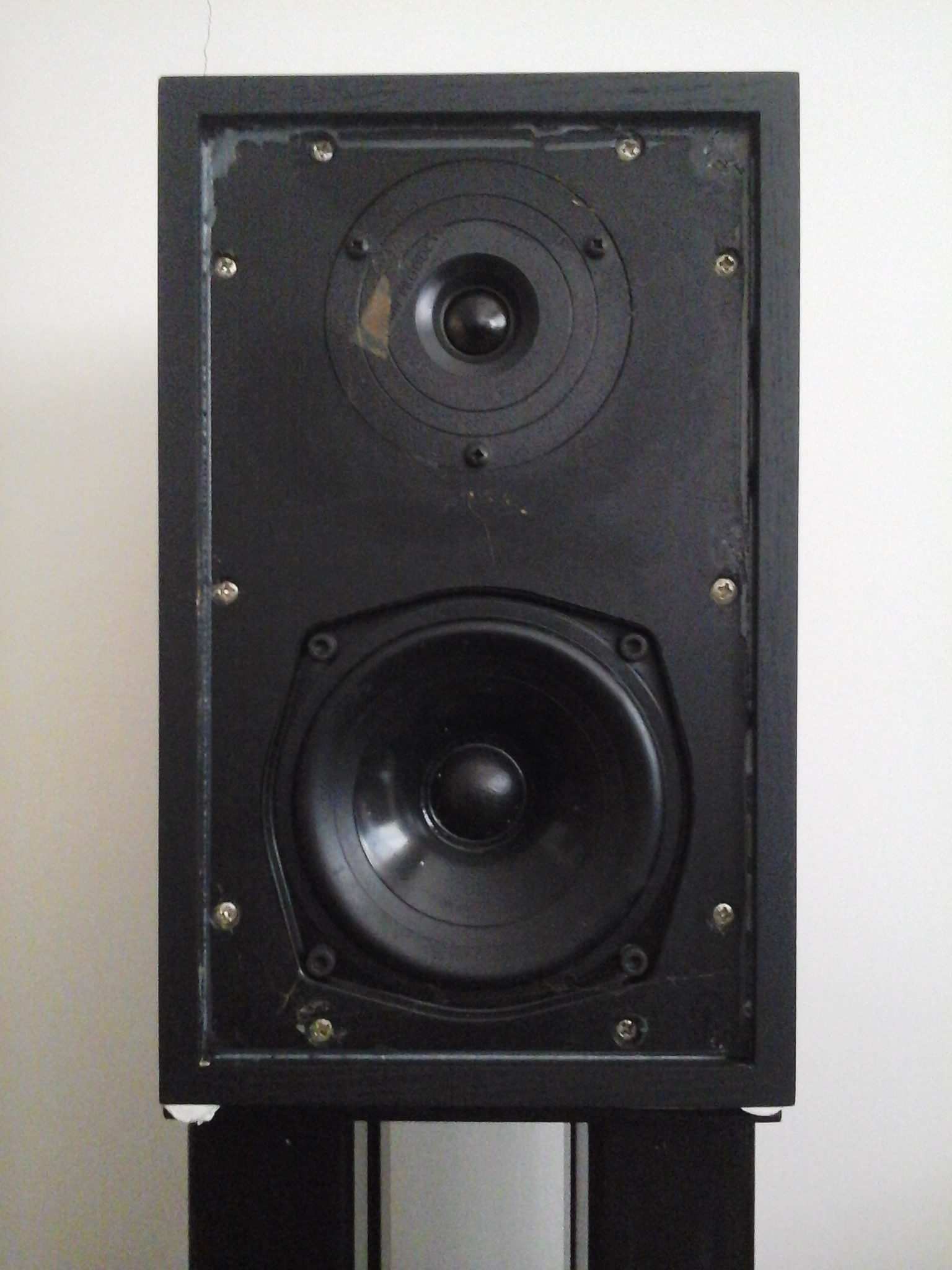
The Linn Kan, which shares two of the drive units of the Isobarik

The Isobarik Sara is a product concurrent with the PMS for the whole of its life. This 2-way, 4-ohm, design was a physically much smaller product – measuring 425 × 332 × 244 mm (16.7 × 13.1 × 9.6 in) – that required tall speaker stands. Launched in 1978, it was Linn's entry-level loudspeaker until the Kan (a non-isobaric bookshelf speaker using the same Linn D20-LP-1 and KEF B110 drive units as its big brother) was released. The Kan was discontinued in 1990.

In the late 1980s, Linn worked on a replacement for the Isobarik. The project bearing the codename "Isobarik LS2000" became the Keltik. Although the final product does not bear the Isobarik name, the technology was mentioned in marketing materials and the product manual. Other products bearing the trade-marked "Isobarik" name include the Melodik Active Isobarik Bass and the Majik Isobarik (2011– )
