= Naim NAIT =

Integrated audio amplifier

First-generation "chrome bumper" Naim NAIT

The Naim NAIT (acronym for "Naim Audio Integrated amplifier") is an integrated amplifier from the British hi-fi manufacturer, Naim Audio. The original NAIT is one of the most recognisable pieces of hi-fi equipment ever made. Hi-fi critic Lucio Cadeddu recognised its legendary status, referring to it as "one of the most controversial and famous integrated amps in the history of HiFi".

Having already made their name producing solid-state pre-amplifier and power-amplifier separates, Naim launched a low-powered integrated amplifier that embodies the qualities of its amplifiers, aimed at cost-conscious audiophiles.

Since the NAIT was launched in 1983, it has had six updates. In 2007, Naim released a high end amplifier, the SUPERNAIT. As of 2018, there are three models available- the entry-level NAIT 5si the mid-range NAIT XS 2, and the flagship SUPERNAIT 2.

== History ==
Up to that point a manufacturer of solid-state pre-/power- amplifier separates, Naim Audio wanted an entry-level integrated amplifier to complement their range and widen their appeal. They worked to create a low-powered model that shared the family characteristics and sound. The approach, seemingly against the received wisdom of the time that power and sound quality go hand in hand, remained nevertheless controversial, despite the fact that NAD Electronics had trail-blazed five years earlier with the top-selling low-cost audiophile amplifier, the NAD 3020. The Naim Audio Integrated amplifier (or NAIT) was created by Julian Vereker as a minimalist black shoe-box design that includes a phono and two line-level inputs – one for tuner and one for tape recorder. The phono input, for moving magnet cartridges, is derived from the NAC 32 pre-amplifier. The NAIT was launched in 1983, ten years after the firm was founded.

In terms of styling, the NAIT, priced in the UK at £253, was housed in a small black aluminium "chrome bumper" case shared by other "half-size" Naim components at the time. (Note: the "half-size" aluminium "shoe-box" measures 10.9 by 8.1 by 3.0 inches (276 mm × 205 mm × 76 mm)) On the left side of the front panel, a plastic volume knob is adjacent to a small-diameter rotating potentiometer that controls the balance. Then follows a bank of three press-button selector switches – for each of phono, tuner, tape – then a power on–off button. On the right side is a light-emitting diode (LED) indicating activity status. Sam Tellig of Stereophile said that the NAIT was "a profoundly anarchistic, almost subversive product".

The first "chrome bumper" version was followed by a second, then two Olive incarnations (including the NAIT 3), and three NAIT 5 versions. All bear the Naim Audio logo, but none have any markings or other indication of their model numbers on the fascia.

Between 1983 and 2007, Naim had only one integrated amplifier available, although the product has seen several guises. Naim extended the range with the SUPERNAIT in 2007, and the XS barely a year later. In 2013, the NAIT range consists of the entry-level NAIT 5si and the top-of-the-range SUPERNAIT 2, with the XS 2 slotting in the middle. Some of the models provide an upgrade path for their equipment by allowing the simple insertion of an external power supply unit.

=== Design and power ===
Insistent on the unimportance of specifications in general, Naim never published technical specifications for this low-powered design. Trade speculation of its power output ranged from 5 to 15 watts per channel. Naim confirmed years later that the NAIT is rated at 13 watts. (Note: Unless otherwise specified, Watts (W) and Watts per channel (WPC) are used interchangeably everywhere, and stated for loads of 8 ohms of impedance) Part of its mystique seemed to stem from its low power: in developing the successor to the NAIT, Naim founder Julian Vereker remarked that R&D "cooked up a more powerful version and presented it to me on my return [from holiday but] it sounded awful."

In its product manual, the NAIT is said to have "low continuous power output ... balanced by a very large peak current capacity so there are no restrictions on the size or type of loudspeaker that may be used. But please don't expect the impossible". Hi-Fi Journal wrote that "the NAIT excelled in musical terms ... and would comfortably drive loudspeakers that caused other amplifiers to sound lumpen and distinctly unmusical". And for that reason, many people who owned the Quad Electrostatic Loudspeaker (ESL) – which are known to be a very difficult load for amplifiers – would choose the NAIT to drive their speakers. Reviewers attribute the perception of power of the NAITs to the over-engineered, dedicated power supplies that ensure generous current delivery for musical transients.

As part of the 5-series redesign, mechanical and electronic changes introduced in the NAIT 5i (italic 'i') include attention to wiring, control of internal heat dissipation, radio-frequency interference and mechanical vibration through more efficient materials, compliant mounting and decoupling. The SUPERNAIT benefits from a fully active line-level preamp developed for the NAC 552 pre-amplifier, and its output section is derived largely from the NAP 200 power amplifier.

In launching the 2013 NAIT range, Steve Sells, electronic design manager of Naim, explained how the new NAITs fulfilled the goal of delivering sound quality performance. They are stripped of superfluous components and features, and as such, the digital–analogue converter (DAC) previously available on the SUPERNAIT has not found its way into its successor. The transformer is deliberately positioned as far away as possible from the inputs to avoid electromagnetic interference, while the power supply and its capacitors are closer to both the transformer and the output devices. Non-audio circuitry for controlling the amplifiers are optically isolated from signal sections, and are designed to power down when not in use, to avoid interference.

=== Construction ===
While reviewers criticised the styling of early NAITs of having a distinctly cottagey feel, Ian White observed that the typical Naim product is "meticulously laid out, clean, and well put together". Housed in the same small, black "half-size" aluminium cases used by Naim pre-amplifiers and power supplies, the electronic components are of high quality and discrete – with few or no integrated circuits, mounted on a single, printed circuit board. For many years, Holden & Fisher supplied custom-made toroidal transformers used in the amplifiers. The ones used in NAIT were rated 100 VA, but these have been progressively up-rated over the years, with consequent increases in power output: the entry-level NAIT 5si has a powerful 300 VA transformer for the delivery of 60 W of rated output.

While Naim's practice of using DIN connectors has been regarded by some reviewers as quirky or arrogant, DIN sockets continue to be Naim's choice for line-level inputs. From standard DIN sockets used in the "half-size" NAITs, Naim upgraded to higher-quality locking DIN sockets on the NAIT 3. However, models since the NAIT 5i include a number of hard-wired parallel inputs using RCA sockets. As the NAIT was conceived as an entry-level offering, the RCA connector – undoubtedly more popular with mass-market equipment – was offered in place of the BNC for the phono source. In all 2013 models, RCA inputs double the DIN counterparts. Banana plugs, the absence of tone controls, the tendency to harshness when cold are family traits inherited by the NAIT.

"NAIT 1" to NAIT 3 have hard-wired mains cables. Since NAIT 3, the on–off switch has been located on the back of the amplifier – given that units are meant to be permanently switched on; since NAIT 5, power is delivered through a detachable mains cable via an IEC connector fixed to the back panel. Consequently, the front panel looks more minimalistic.

The 2013 range of Naim equipment has aluminium chassis and sleeves; the fascia is die-cast zinc. Inside, circuit boards float, and the rear-mounted mains switch and IEC socket are decoupled to reduce microphony. Techradar noted that the XS, launched in late 2008, is the first Naim device to use a new bayonet PCB-mounting technique to float the circuitry.

== Popularity ==
Strong and polarised opinions about Naim amplifiers led to the NAIT being called "one of the most controversial and famous integrated amps in the history of HiFi" by Lucio Cadeddu. This controversy has been as much to do with the company's refusal to follow the fashion of "audiophile-approved values" – such as power ratings and holographic soundstage – as its idiosyncratic preference for connectors other than RCA connectors and its eschewing of tone controls. The volume control always sits on the wrong (left) side of the facia. However, the trade noted that the unique sound of the NAIT caused it to become "an instant classic" upon release. As one of the most recognisable pieces of hi-fi, the NAIT has acquired an iconic and legendary status among integrated amplifiers; Hi-fi World said: "If there was ever a quintessentially British affordable audiophile amplifier, the Naim NAIT is it."

== Incarnations ==
	year introduced	chassis	voiced by	power rating	toroid (VA)	external power for pre-amp	Inputs		
	year introduced	chassis	voiced by	power rating	toroid (VA)	external power for pre-amp	no.	phono	digital
NAIT1	1983	chrome	Vereker	13W	100	✗	3	✓	✗
NAIT2	1988	chrome	George	13W		✗	4	✓	✗
	1989	olive				✗			
NAIT3	1993	slim olive	George	30W	120	✓	4 + 1	✓	✗
NAIT5	2000	alloy	George	30W	180	✓	6	✓	✗
NAIT5i	2003	alloy	Sells	50W	240	✗	4	✗	✗
NAIT5i	2007	alloy		50W	240	✗			
NAIT XS	2008	alloy	Sells	60W	290	✓	4 x 2	✗	✗
SUPERNAIT	2007	alloy	Sells	80W	350	✓	6 + 5	✗	✓
NAIT5si	2013	alloy		60W	300	✗	2 x 2	✗	✗
NAIT XS2	2013	alloy		70W	350	✓	4 × 2 + 2	✗	✗
SUPERNAIT 2	2013	alloy		80W	400	✓	4 × 2 + 2	✗	✗

=== NAIT (1983) ===
Back of the Olive NAIT 2 (factory-modified to work as a preamp-only unit). There are recessed banana sockets for speakers, three DIN inputs and one pair of RCA phono sockets

There are two major variants of the NAIT, and apparently several minor variants with different motherboards. The simplest and most notable distinction between older and later models is the LED on the fascia: the red LED on the earlier NAIT became a green one on the later model. The balance control unusually only attenuated the left channel by up to −3 dB; the lack of obvious markings to indicate a central position was criticised for being "slightly confusing".

Tellig was ambivalent about the NAIT 1 in Stereophile: noting that it was "a good-sounding little amp", he criticised it for "look[ing] very cheaply made, inside and out", and for its lack of features, particularly the absence of an 'aux' or 'CD' input, tone controls, or moving coil input.

=== NAIT 2 (1988) ===
The "chrome bumper" NAIT 2 was designed to be factory-modified to work as a preamp-only unit. The upgrade path is assured by partnering with Naim's own stereo power amplifiers – in particular, the NAP 90 and NAP 140, both of whose in-built power supplies can power their own pre-amplifiers.

=== NAIT 3 (1993) ===
The NAIT 3 is derived from the NAC 92 preamplifier and the NAP 90/3 power amplifier with which it was launched – it is basically the NAC 92 and NAP 90/3 in one box. Its flat slimline Olive case with rounded edges measures 17 by 12 by 2.2 inches (432 mm × 305 mm × 56 mm). The NAIT 3, costing £500 at its launch, has five line inputs.

Back of a NAIT 3, showing the 4 DIN sockets and 1 pair of RCA sockets

A remote control version, identified by the 'NAIT 3R' designation, was released in 1995. The NAIT 3 can be upgraded to 'R' specification by adding a separate remote control board. Ian White said its construction, fit and finish and performance/cost ratio made it a price-point leader.

=== NAIT 5 (2000) ===
The NAIT 5 was successor to the '3'. It is housed in the same low-vibration black die-cast alloy casing employed in the '5 Series', and measures 17.2 by 12 by 2.3 inches (43.7 cm × 30.5 cm × 5.8 cm). and employs surface-mount technology. Like its brethren, attention is paid to protecting the circuit boards from vibration. The remote control function of the NAIT 5 is a new feature to the NAIT, and allows volume and the balance adjustment.

=== NAIT range (2003–13) ===
The NAIT is henceforth a range extended across its three series – the entry-level 'i Series', XS, and Classic series. (Note: 2009 UK retail price: NAIT 5i – £735; NAIT XS – £1,250; SUPERNAIT – £2,350) The three units all share a styling, but the height of the case increases for the higher models.

All three NAITs of the range from the back, showing doubled-up input sockets and banana speaker sockets

The 50-watt NAIT 5i replaces the 30-watt NAIT 5. The phono input has been banished, so owners of turntables would need to plug a head amp (phono pre-amplifier) into one of the line inputs. Styling is similar to its predecessor, with basic black with green fluorescent highlights. However, it has fewer selector buttons on the right side of the face-plate. When the SUPERNAIT was launched in 2007, the 5i was upgraded to the "italic specification" NAIT 5i.

The NAIT 5i (italic 'i') has an additional 3.5mm jack for portable devices on the front panel, reviewers noted sonic improvements "from the first track"; it is demonstrably better at handling higher sound pressure levels than the '5i'.

NAIT XS: (Note: NAIT XS price: £1,250. Output 60W per channel, 90W per channel into 4 ohms) Reviewers have described the XS as a "SUPERNAIT in the slimmer casework of the Series S". It also has a 3.5mm stereo input with auto-switching on the front-panel, suitable for an MP3 player. A powered input, provided for turntable users, is designed to supply one of Naim's external phono pre-amplifiers. The unity gain option and AV bypass function allow it to be used in conjunction with an AV processor in a home cinema system. It also includes optional RS-232 interface for custom installations.

The SUPERNAIT, released in 2007, incorporates two coaxial and three optical inputs, including a combination mini-jack/mini-Toslink connector with auto-switching on the front panel connectivity for digital sources that facilitate direct connection of computers, media servers and the like. Its circuitry is supposedly identical to that of the XS, but has a 24-bit DAC that can be called from any of five S/PDIF inputs. It has more features, a more well-endowed power supply allowing delivery of 80 watts' music, and can bi-amp suitable speakers by adding a secondary power amplifier.

=== NAIT range (2013) ===
To mark the 40th anniversary of Naim Audio and the 30th birthday of the original NAIT, Naim unveiled a new 3-product range under the NAIT brand: the NAIT 5si, NAIT XS 2 and SUPERNAIT 2. The range has seen a general uprating of the transformer compared with the versions they replaced, allowing for better power delivery. The manufacturer claims use of better components in critical areas and new circuitry. All three models have built-in headphone amplifiers. The digital–analogue converter has been removed as being available either as a separate unit, or as part of the Uniti.

The NAIT 5si is the entry-level NAIT and the direct replacement of the NAIT 5i (with italic 'i'); the NAIT XS 2 is positioned as the mid-range product. The SUPERNAIT 2, the flagship integrated amplifier in the Naim stable individually decoupled inputs and no digital circuitry. Both incorporate a headphone output via a class-A headphone amplifier. (Note: 2013 UK prices: Naim SUPERNAIT 2 – £2,750; Naim NAIT XS 2 – £1,595; Naim NAIT 5si – £925)

== Reception ==
In Stereophile, Sam Tellig, who was unimpressed with the poor value for money of the NAIT, said the NAIT 2 "sounds insanely great" and that there was "[no] better-sounding integrated amp at the price". (Note: US price of the NAIT 2 (1990): $795) He remarked that the NAIT 2 resembled his Krell KSP-7B / KSA-80 combination sonically, but lacked "ooomph, kick, balls in the bass". Although his colleague Robert Harley disliked the NAIT 2 for its styling, connectors, price, and poor performance on paper, he found it to be the most musically satisfying of several amplifiers in his test.

Reviewers of NAIT rarely fail to mention their characteristic PRAT (pace, rhythm, and timing) sound of Naim. Channa Vithana, wrote comparing the NAIT, NAIT 2, NAIT 3 and NAIT 5 in the October 2007 edition of Hi-fi World:

...the original NAIT had the best musical timing with precision tempos. The NAIT 2 had the most tuneful bass with a much quieter musical background in comparison to the NAIT. The NAIT 3 had clearer sound overall than all the others, and opened out the music superbly by being the most free flowing. The NAIT 5i was easily the most refined, yet was more immediate too. It proved superb with the tonal qualities of instruments, and added a dash of sweetness to higher frequencies also.

David Price, writing in Hi-fi News, said that with the earlier NAITs gave the impression of "something overly reminiscent of British hi-fi's 'cottage industry' past", but remarked that the NAIT 5 made "all other integrateds sound positively pedestrian". Ian White said the NAIT 5 "sounds like a NAIT 3 that finally finished going through puberty and emerged as a mature adult", and What Hi-fi? referred to the NAIT 5 as "one of the finest amplifiers available this side of 1000 pounds"; In The Absolute Sound, Wayne Garcia noted that the "staggeringly good sound and wonderful value" of the NAIT 5i contributed significantly to raising Naim's profile in the US audio market. Matthew Masters remarked about the 5i amp and CD player that "it didn't seem to matter how complex or demanding the music was, the Naims would sort out the elements then present them in a perfectly-timed and coherent musical picture that helped me understand – and feel – precisely what the performers were on about". Commenting on the NAIT XS, Malcolm Stewart wrote that the NAITs were "a musically communicative, minimalist design". Confirming Naim's upgrade philosophy – the belief and objective that incremental improvements to their equipment can be gained with improving the quality of the power source, Martin Colloms of Hi-fi Critic concluded about adding an external power supply to the top-of-the-range Supernait:

... simply transformed the sound quality, immediately bringing a substantial and obvious improvement. Supernait-with-Hi-Cap has greater poise and dynamic range, is better at getting feet tapping, has less 'character', a bigger soundstage, and the bass is tauter with less 'thump'.
