= NAIT =

NAIT may refer to:

- National Animal Identification and Tracing in New Zealand
- National Association of Industrial Technology
- North American Islamic Trust, an organization in Plainfield, Indiana in the United States
- Northern Alberta Institute of Technology
- Neonatal alloimmune thrombocytopenia, a platelet-related disease affecting fetuses and infants, which can be fatal.
- Naim NAIT, an integrated amplifier
