= Quad Electrostatic Loudspeaker =

First production electrostatic loudspeaker

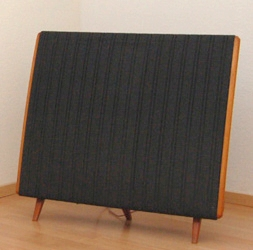
Late version Quad "ESL-57" loudspeaker with black grilles and rosewood end caps

The Quad Electrostatic Loudspeaker (ESL) is the world's first production full-range electrostatic loudspeaker, launched in 1957 by Quad Electroacoustics, then known as the Acoustical Manufacturing Co. Ltd. The speaker is shaped somewhat like a home electric radiator curved slightly on the vertical axis. They are widely admired for their clarity and precision, but known to be difficult speakers to run and maintain.

The original ESL, in production between 1957 and 1985, has been hailed in Sound & Vision as one of the most important speakers of the 20th century. It was succeeded in 1981 by the ESL-63, which remained in production until 1999. As of 2013, Quad maintains four electrostatic speakers in its range.

== History ==
Acoustical Manufacturing Company had launched a ribbon-hybrid, horn-loaded "Corner Ribbon Loudspeaker" in 1949, but this was not commercially successful. The electrostatics were designed by Theo Williamson, and the company's founder, Peter Walker, from a principle elaborated by Edward W. Kellogg for General Electric that was granted a patent in 1934. However, more immediately, a book published in the US in 1954 extolling the scientific merits of the electrostatic [ESL] transducer (Note: Hunt, F. V. "Electroacoustics" (1954) provided the mathematical solution to the distortion problem of the ESL in various forms. He calculated that in push-pull form would be capable of handling large signals without much distortion if the diaphragm was given a constant charge (rather than a constant potential or voltage).) inspired Walker to develop an electrostatic loudspeaker of his own; this was technologically enabled by the Mylar film developed by Dupont that came to market in 1949. Walker demonstrated a prototype electrostatic panel speaker (with exceptional clarity in the midrange), and a full-frequency infinite baffle speaker (with ample bass response) at the British Sound Recording Association Annual Exhibition in May 1955. After more research, the large panel speaker with better response over the whole frequency range was demonstrated to the Physical Society in March 1956. The ESL entered commercial production in 1957, and was discontinued only in 1985.

Development of its successor began in 1963, giving rise to the product name "ESL-63", launched in 1981. It attempted to address both the deficiency in bass response of the original ESL and its extreme directionality at high frequencies. The latter goal is achieved by splitting the stators into eight concentric rings, each fed with a slight time delay compared to the ring immediately inwards, thereby attempting to emulate a point source. The last ESL-63 left the factory in 1999, when it was superseded by the ESL-988 and its larger variant the ESL-989.

== Speaker ==
Stereophile described the speaker as having been designed for "serious-music (call that 'classical') listeners who play records more for musical enjoyment than for the sound". Quad launched the speaker in 1957, priced at £52, believing that an audio system should be able to extract everything of value that is on a recording, while de-emphasising the irritations of mediocre sound recordings. It consists of a minimalistic, slightly curved, flat panel. The "Quad Electrostatic Loudspeaker" or "ESL", as the designers intended to call it, is variously referred to as the Quad 57 and the Quad 55. Its descendants are still often simply referred to as Quad Electrostatic Loudspeaker as part of the legacy. Walker called the concept behind the ESL-63 FRED, being the acronym for "Full-Range Electrostatic Dipole".

=== Design ===
An electrostatic speaker has only a frame to support the charged diaphragm. It uses ultra-thin stretched Mylar (Biaxially-oriented polyethylene terephthalate) film as the main component of its drive units. There are two perforated plates with a potential difference of up to 10,000 volts, between which a very thin film, coated with a mildly electrically conductive substance, is sandwiched. Sound is produced when the audio signal – amplified by a step-up transformer – sets the film diaphragm into motion. The different charge between the two plates allows the diaphragm to be alternately attracted and repelled by each plate. In the original QUAD, two bass panels flank one treble panel to provide full range sound.

Its treble panel diaphragm is further subdivided into midrange and tweeter sections, achieved by clamping it on each side of its centre. Both midrange and tweeter sections are driven separately, and the entire treble unit operates at substantially lower voltages – operating voltages are specified as 6 KV for the bass and 1.5 KV for the treble. The speaker needs to be plugged into the mains and must be charged prior to use. This is because the diaphragm operates in a "constant charge" mode, and it takes time for the charge to build up. In practice, the speaker is usable after charging for less than half a minute, but the sound gradually improves as the charge builds up. Best performance is achieved when the speaker has charged fully, which can take up to an hour. The electricity is only to charge the diaphragm, so consumption is negligible.

The electrostatic design does away with two major weaknesses of boxed speakers: enclosure colourations and signal degradation due to the crossover. The crossover in the ESL consists merely of resistors which work with the inherent capacitance of the speaker elements to obtain a first-order response. Because it is dipolar, both sides of the elements are not enclosed, but radiate directly into the air. Thus, colourations due to crossover components minimized and box-induced reflections are eliminated.

Fast transient response and low distortion are both characteristic of electrostatics. The driver, being only 0.00137-inch thick and weighing only 3 mg, is thus capable of stopping and starting seemingly instantaneously with no damping necessary to the drive units. However, the design also limits bandwidth to between 40 Hz and 10 kHz. Kohli of TNT noted that upper register starts to taper above 10 kHz and then falls off severely beyond 13 kHz, and is 15-20 dB down at 20 kHz. The speaker's design makes them extremely directional, and the general practice is to toe in the speakers to point directly to the listener. Although a slight deviation did not seem to make a difference, it is in practice not possible for more than one person to enjoy a reasonably balanced sound stage with the ESL.

Contrary to the flat appearance of the loudspeaker, all three panels are slightly curved along the vertical axis to improve quality. The panels themselves are flat, but obtain their curvature by being slightly bent to a curved backing. With the dipolar nature of the speaker emitting sound from both front and back surfaces as it does, the application of a felt sheet to the rear of the panels damps and absorbs high frequencies radiating from the back. A crossover network, set at 500 Hz, remains necessary to adjust for back-to-front interference causing loss in output at low frequencies. In addition, the speaker should stand in free space to achieve optimum sound. The instructions book contains advice against placement of the speaker in corners or positions close to or parallel with walls, and further explains that a corner placement will adversely affect bass response and be detrimental to the midrange because of standing waves generated.

Its impedance is specified as '30-15 ohm in range 40 Hz-8 kHz falling off above 8 kHz', although another source states 'impedances are approximately 1.8 Ohms at 20 kHz but 60 Ohms at 150 Hz', and its load is highly capacitive. It does not consume large amounts of power so much as it feeds it back to the amplifier in opposition at some points during each cycle. This is very demanding on amplifiers' stability.

Although it is designed to be used with the QUAD II, 303, or 405 power amplifiers with limiters, a power amplifier capable of delivering 15 watts per channel suffices – excessive voltage input is known to cause arcing within the speaker panels. In fact, the instructions book states that any properly-regulated amplifier delivering no more than 33 V peak into any load is unlikely to cause damage to the speaker. Electrostatic speakers are more accurately rated by voltage, not power. In the ESL's case, at the rated nominal impedance of 16 ohms, the limit of 33 peak volts would be reached when the amplifier's power output reaches 15 watts (if it were driving a conventional load).

The most common failure modes were loss of sensitivity caused by dust infiltrating the speaker panels, and internal arcing of the panels caused by excessive power to the step-up transformer; use at high altitudes may also cause the same effect. Also, because of its novel electrical characteristics, the speaker could cause some amplifiers to become unstable and could result in damage to either or both. Late in the speaker's life, many owners found that the highly-stable 15-watt Naim NAIT launched in 1983 worked well with the ESL.

=== Construction ===
The ESL measures 31 by 34.5 by 10.5 inches (79 cm × 88 cm × 27 cm) and weighs 35 pounds (16 kg). In terms of appearance, the original ESL has an expanded metal grille, and three little wooden feet. The earlier version has golden-bronze grilles and classic teak end caps. Later production versions have black grilles, and end caps have a rosewood finish; other minor variants exist. The speaker's electronics components, consisting mainly of an audio transformer, EHT power supply, crossover and mains transformer, are fixed to the base of the cabinet.

The original ESL-57 suffered from reliability issues, frequently caused by use of inappropriate amplification or being driven too hard. In the main, the diaphragm would arc from being overdriven, or the audio transformer would seize up from being exposed to excessive voltages.

The design's lack of structural integrity is seen as another significant weakness of the Quad ESL-63 since its inception, and lived on in its various successors. Other shortcomings include very limited sound pressure levels, (Note: maximum SPL achieved of 98 dB measured at 1 metre on-axis) meaning that it won't play loud, and its bass response was lacking. In addition, one reviewer experienced problems with shut-downs playing music with high intensity bass drums.

=== Product revisions ===
Quad have now brought out five generations of the classic electrostatic design. Originally designed for monaural sound in a domestic context, the popularisation of stereophonic sound prompted the manufacturer to modify the electrostatic panels to improve their stereo dispersion. These speakers featured larger panels and a revolutionary stator design, made up of eight concentric rings fed from the centre outwards through analogue delay lines, so that the audio signal gives the illusion of radiating from a point source one foot behind the panel.

Quad addressed the limitations of the original design to some degree with the ESL-63. Development of the newer design was initiated in 1963 and the product was released at the CES of 1981. Because of a changed orientation, the ESL-63 measures 36 by 26 by 6 inches (91 cm × 66 cm × 15 cm), the speaker seemed smaller than before. New "triac clamping" protection circuit was incorporated to prevent arcing. Another "crowbar action" protection circuit could detect the high-frequency noise that accompanies the ionisation of air when the speaker arcs, and shuts down the power when that occurs. Power rating is increased to 100 W. Furthermore, because the panels in the original ESL were prone to attracting dust, the ESL-63 was made dust-proof.

In 1988, a new marketing position was needed for the US market. As the rising Pound Sterling made the product much more expensive for US customers, it was decided to improve the specification of the ESL-63 and target the $4,000 price point with a "USA Monitor" version. It was modelled on the more rugged "Pro" model that possessed metal grilles and a steel frame (instead of aluminium) which had been created for the recording division of Philips.

=== Reception ===
Its launch was eagerly awaited: even before it was launched, several articles were written about it in Wireless World in 1955; it appeared on the cover of the 1956 Hi-Fi Yearbook. Generally well-received from its launch, the speaker was dubbed "Walker's Wonder" very early on. The loudspeaker was used as studio monitors for controlling the sound quality of broadcasts. Such professional users included Philips and the BBC.

The original ESL, in production between 1957 and 1985, sold 54,000 pairs during its life. Despite some major weaknesses, it is universally hailed as one of the most important speakers of the 20th century. Home Theater Review said it was "the most cherished hi-fi product ever", and that Walker had been elevated to god-like status in the audio world. What Hi-Fi notes the fanatical loyalty from owners of the speaker or fascination from people who yearn to own them. Demand for second-hand versions of the original 1957 ESLs or the later ESL-63s remains buoyant many years after their being discontinued.

Demand from customers resulted in manufacture of the "ESL-57" continuing in the UK until 1995. Quad's machine tooling for their manufacture was then bought by QUAD's representative in Germany, QUAD Musikwiedergabe who continue to manufacture complete speakers and spare parts, and overhaul customers' speakers. There are small companies all around the world dedicated to servicing this speaker.

Commenting on the ESL-63, J. Gordon Holt of Stereophile considered it was a major failure of the speaker for it to shut down during orchestral climaxes. He said that "regardless of the sonic merits it possesses [the speaker] simply did not have the power-handling capability" for more recent program material on CD. However, this review was conducted at a high altitude location, which affected the speakers' ability to reach high volumes.

==== Signature sound ====
The ESL is renowned for sonic transparency and very low distortion. Its midrange performance is usually described in superlative terms, common to other electrostatic designs. Its sound is tonally neutral, exceptionally spacious, and transient response very fast. A properly configured stereo pair would generate a very small 'sweet spot' where the sound stage snaps into focus. This led to criticisms of the speaker's directionality which in practice was rarely a problem and had the benefit of reducing the effects of room resonances.

The experience of listening to the ESL is often described as non-fatiguing or listenable. Sam Tellig wrote in Stereophile in June 1989 of the neutral sound emanating from the ESL-63: "There is no discontinuity from bass to midrange to treble—it's all so natural. Transient response is excellent. There are no boxy colorations because there are no boxes". Its superior sonic characteristics were offset by its moderate power handling, and the need for a relatively large space in which to "breathe". Its usable frequency response is from 40 Hz to well past 20 kHz, and is occasionally criticised for being bass light. Its moderate bass extension is considered adequate for classical music fans, although later incarnations are said to deliver better bass performance.
