= Focal-JMLab =

French company specializing in audio equipment

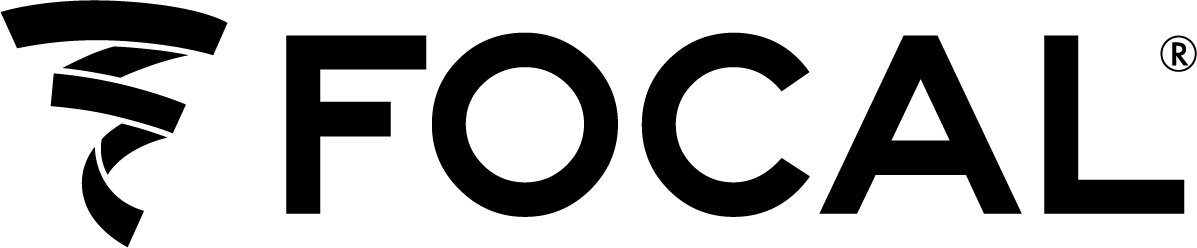
- Industry: Consumer electronics
- Founded: 1979
- Founder: Jacques Mahul
- Headquarters: La Talaudière, France
- Products: home audio, mobile audio, professional audio
- Brands: Focal
- Revenue: € 156 million (2022)
- Owner: Alpha Private Equity
- Number of employees: 300
- Parent: Vervent Audio Holding
- Subsidiaries: Naim Audio, Focal Naim America / Canada, Focal Naim Deutschland and Focal Ébénisterie Bourgogne
- Website: www.focal.com

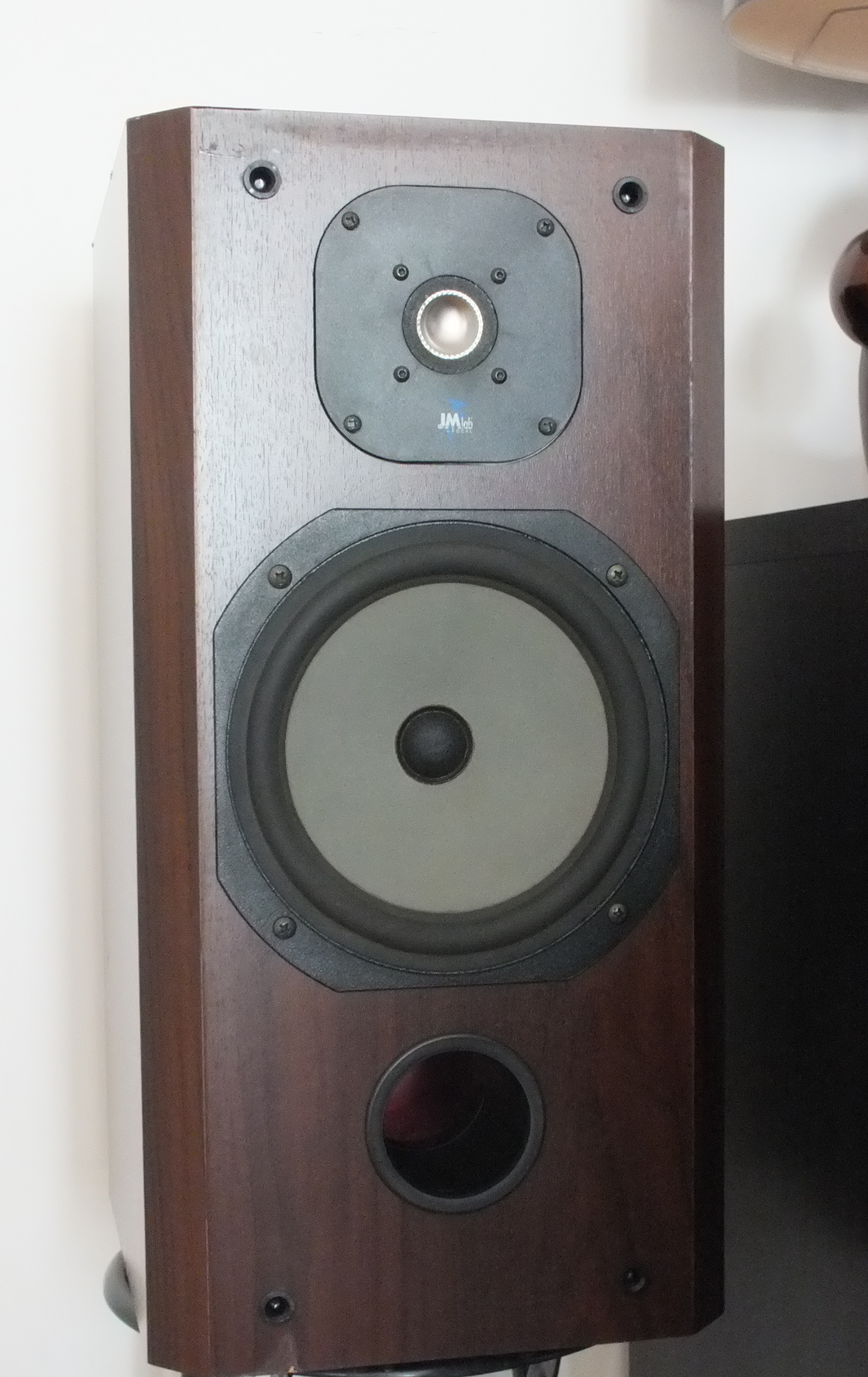
Focal Opal 19ti

Focal-JMlab is a French company that has been designing and selling high fidelity audio systems since 1979. Based in Saint-Étienne, the company manufactures loudspeakers for the home, speaker drivers for automobiles, headphones, professional studio monitors, as well as outdoor speakers and systems dedicated to yachts.

The brand’s Grande Utopia loudspeaker model is considered one of the high-fidelity loudspeakers in the world.

Focal's industrial strategy concentrates on having full control over the entire production process, from the design and manufacturing of the speaker drivers to the assembly of the final product. Its products are entirely designed and developed in France, and the majority of the production is carried out at the workshops in Saint-Étienne (France). Focal has been a member of the Comité Colbert since 2024.

Focal-JMlab generates a €156 million annual turnover and employs around 300 people at its facility in Saint-Étienne, which groups the production, R&D and management departments at the same site. Its export share is 70%.

== History ==
=== 1980s ===
Focal-JMlab, a research office dedicated to acoustics was founded in 1979 in Paris by engineer, high-fidelity enthusiast and technology journalist Jacques Mahul. He began making his first speaker drivers in a small workshop in Saint-Etienne, at a precision mechanics company, which belonged to his father. Whilst producing his speaker drivers, Jacques Mahul also launched his own range of loudspeakers under the brand JMlab. His first loudspeaker, the DB13, was a bookshelf loudspeaker, which produced volumes comparable to larger loudspeakers, particularly in bass frequencies. Initially, he only sold his product to acquaintances but the DB13 was soon launched on the market.

In the 1980s, the two brands became established. Focal focused on innovation, producing specialised products such as the polyglass "V" cone and Polykevlar cone. The materials used on the tweeter evolved from glass fibres to Kevlar, producing a more linear frequency response curve and a smoother and less piercing treble. As for JMlab, the company went from being a manufacturer of small-and medium-sized loudspeakers to a manufacturer of high-end models.

=== 1990s ===
Things rapidly began to pick up speed in 1990 with the arrival of Gérard Chrétien, another high-end, high-fidelity enthusiast and editor-in-chief of the magazine L’Audiophile since 1977. He was also the managing director and marketing director of Focal-JMlab. By adapting the company's products to the demands of the consumer, the brand soon earned its role as a leader in the French loudspeaker market. The company's turnover increased from €9 million in 1992 to €26 million in 2000.

It was also in the early 1990s that the company implemented an export strategy for its loudspeakers across Europe, Southeast Asia and North America. The brand's reputation on the international stage was reinforced by various awards. The JMlab Vega model was voted "Loudspeaker of the Year, 1992" in Japan and in 1996, the Grande Utopia model was praised by the international press.

=== 2000s ===
In 2002, production was relocated to Saint-Etienne, where about three-quarters of production still takes place. The aim is to equip every loudspeaker with "Made in France" speaker drivers.

In 2003, the two brands were incorporated under the name Focal-JMlab for home products, before being renamed as just Focal in 2005 for all product sectors.

Also in 2003, the company began collaborating with Paris-based design agency Pineau & Le Porcher. By combining sound quality and aesthetics, this move made Focal-JMlab products lifestyle loudspeakers in their own right and also gave the company a brand signature. Thus, Focal and Pineau & Le Porcher worked in close collaboration to come up with a completely new design for various ranges: Profile and Electra (2005), Chorus (2006), Utopia (2008) and Dome (2009).

In 2007, the company bought up the Guy HF cabinet-making facility located in Bourbon-Lancy, Saône-et-Loire.

=== 2010s ===
In 2011, Focal-JMlab merged with Naim Audio Limited, the leading high-end electronics brand in the UK, which mainly designs and manufactures audio electronics. The new holding company, Vervent Audio Group, owns and manages the two brands. However, both brands remain independent with their own specific philosophies and their own respective ranges and products.

The two companies began consolidating their activities in 2013, with their presence on a common stand at the High-End Show in Munich.

In 2011, Focal adopted a new visual identity and finally, in 2012, built a showroom and a new auditorium at its site in Saint-Étienne.

In 2014, Focal&Naim Group was taken over by its management team, Naxicap Partners (major shareholder), Aquasourca and Garibaldi Participations. Jacques Mahul remains involved and becomes Focal-JMlab Vice-President. The same year, Focal is recognized by the French state thanks to The Entreprise du Patrimoine Vivant (Living Heritage Company). A label issued by the French Minister for Economy, Finances and Industry to recognize the excellence of traditional and industrial skills in French firms.

In 2015, Guy HF cabinet-making became Focal Ebénisterie Bourgogne.

=== 2020s ===
In 2019, Alpha Private Equity acquired a majority stake in Vervent Audio Group, which was later renamed Vervent Audio Holding. Cédrick Boutonet became the chairman and CEO, and the subsidiaries Focal Naim America and Focal Naim Canada were established.

The same year saw the launch of a worldwide network of Focal Powered by Naim shops, with the first openings in Seoul (South Korea) and Lyon (France). These shops, shop-in-shops and corners dedicated to the Focal and Naim brands offer customers a brand experience. The FPBN network comprises more than 50 stores across North America, Europe and Asia.

In January 2024, Focal became a member of the Comité Colbert, which promotes French expertise and excellence.

=== 2026 acquisition by Barco ===
In March 2026, Belgian projector and display manufacturer Barco announced an agreement in principle to acquire Vervent Audio Group, the parent company of Focal and Naim, for approximately €135 million, a figure representing a little more than one times Vervent's annual revenue of around €110 million. The all-cash deal, to be financed from Barco's own funds, would end the ownership of European private equity firm Alpha Private Equity, which had held Vervent since 2019, and was expected to see Vervent merged into Barco's Entertainment division.

== Technologies ==
Focal-JMlab maintains a regular research and development program in speaker driver technologies. Investments in this field have enabled the company to develop various innovative concepts. Ten innovations have been patented to date.

=== Inverted dome tweeter (1981) ===
Focal designed and developed an inverted dome tweeter in 1981. (Inverted dome tweeters appeared at least as early as the late 1960s in the EPI 100 loudspeaker manufactured by EPI/Epicure, which had an inverted fabric dome.) One of its main advantages is its low directionality and high dynamics. The majority of the brand's tweeters still feature this technology.

=== K2 cone (1986) ===
In 1986, the company introduced the Polykevlar sandwich structure. The Poly-K cone is composed of two layers of aramid fibres applied to either side of a hollow micro-ball structure to improve the compromise between weight, rigidity, and damping.

=== Polyglass cone (1988) ===
Focal introduced polyglass technology in 1988. This technology involves depositing fine glass micro-balls on the surface of a cellulose pulp cone (paper). The combination of glass and paper results in a very rigid material with a low mass, providing excellent damping qualities. The Polyglass cone resulted in a very linear frequency response curve and improved the definition of the midrange.

=== "W" sandwich cone (1995) ===
In 1995, Focal improved its sandwich concept with its "W" cone system, which consists of two sheets of glass fibres applied to a structural foam core. Unlike mono-material cones, the "W" sandwich cone optimizes the frequency response curve by maximising mass, rigidity, and damping.

=== Beryllium tweeter (2002) ===
In 2002, Focal introduced a new innovation to their product line: the Beryllium Tweeter. This was only the second time a tweeter had ever been manufactured from Beryllium. Yamaha had previously introduced the Beryllium tweeter and Beryllium mid-range speaker in the NS-1000 back in 1974.

=== Tweeter Al-Mg (2007) ===
This tweeter was introduced by Focal JMlab in 2007. The use of aluminium increases damping qualities, whereas the use of magnesium increases the rigidity of the dome. This enabled the frequency response of the Al-Mg Tweeter to be increased to 28 kHz. The Al-Mg Tweeter is used on the Chorus range of the Home line and on the CMS and Shape ranges of the Pro line, among others.

=== Flax membrane cone (2013) ===
Eighteen years after introducing the "W" sandwich cones, Focal launched the new Made in France "F" Sandwich cone (for Flax). Composed of flax fibres enclosed in two thin layers of glass fibre, this offers a natural sound without colouration thanks to light, rigid and damped cones.

=== Tuned Mass Damper (2015) ===
Tuned Mass Damper technology utilizes an additional mass that oscillates in opposition to the resonance frequency in order to control resonance and reduce distortions in medium speaker drivers. The suspension is specifically optimized to prevent distortions and enhance definition.

=== Infinite Horn Loading system (2015) ===
The rear of the Beryllium tweeter is loaded via a small cavity which is connected to the exterior of the enclosure by a horn. The inside is filled with a damping material. The rear wave of the tweeter is gradually absorbed to reduce distortion.

=== M-shaped inverted dome tweeter (2016) ===
Tweeters from the K2 Power, which were renewed in 2016, feature a distinctive M-shaped profile. This unique shape extends the frequency response, offers smoother diffusion, and provides a more detailed treble.

=== M-profile cone (2018) ===
Utopia M speaker drivers (range launched in 2018) feature an M-profile cone, which combines rigidity, damping, and lightness for more linear frequency response, reduced harmonic distortion, and better sound dispersion.

=== Slatefiber cone (2019) ===
Developed with the Chora range, the Slatefiber cone is a membrane composed of recycled non-woven carbon fibres and thermoplastic polymer. Made in France at Focal, this "slate effect" cone provides a dynamic and rich sound.

=== Frak tweeter (2022) ===
In 2022, Focal engineers developed the FRAK tweeter, which was used in the K2 Power M range of kits. The cone was made of aluminium and magnesium, combined with an M-shaped profile.

== Products ==
Focal-JMlab has organized its range of products into five categories: the Home line, the Car line, the Pro line for music industry professionals, the Headphones line since 2012, and the Integration line, which includes public address sound systems, outdoor speakers, and systems dedicated to yachts.

The Home speaker sector is divided into two collections:

- High-fidelity loudspeakers: All the speakers in this collection are designed, developed, and manufactured in France. They combine all the Focal technological innovations, such as the inverted dome tweeter, "W" and "F" sandwich cones, etc. The principal products include the Utopia, Sopra, Aria EVO X, Kanta, Chora, Vestia, and Theva. In 2013, Easya, a high-fidelity wireless loudspeaker, was launched. Due to built-in Bluetooth technology, they could be connected to multiple sources. The Grande Utopia, the iconic loudspeaker of the collection, was first introduced in 1995 and encapsulates all the expertise and experience that Focal has acquired since its creation. The second generation, in 2002, had the particularity of featuring pure Beryllium dome tweeters, which enabled it to receive, the year after, the "Golden Sound" award in Japan. The third generation, launched in 2008, embodied the best of Focal technologies. Designed by Pineau & Le Porcher, The Grande Utopia EM distinguished itself through its extraordinary dimensions: weighing 570 lbs (260 kg) and standing over 6 ft (2m) high. The cabinets can be customised at the cabinet-making facility in Bourbon-Lancy which is in charge of manufacturing and finishing the cabinets. In 2018, Focal introduced the Grande Utopia EM Evo and Stella Utopia EM Evo, featuring the brand's latest technology.
- Home Cinema speakers systems: Since 2008, with the arrival of the Dôme miniature loudspeaker (available with Flax cone since 2014), Focal has adapted its expertise to new methods of music consumption by introducing compact loudspeakers, "Plug and Play" systems, multimedia, and more recently, wireless options such as the XS Book Wireless in 2013. In 2013, Focal launched 5.1 Home Cinema Packs. In May 2014, Focal entered the soundbar market by launching Dimension, a 5.1 soundbar which, when paired with its subwoofer, can be used as a sound plate for a flat screen. The Sib line evolved in 2017 and became Sib Evo featuring Dolby Atmos technology.
- At the end of the 1980s the Car Audio department was born, and the first car audio products were launched. In June 2014, Focal launched the Ultima kit, a hand-made kit made in France that incorporates Focal technologies from the Grande Utopia EM and the SM9 monitor loudspeaker. Also made in France, the Utopia M and K2 Power M kits allow for custom installations through a new 'à la carte' concept, which enables users to build their own audio system by selecting their kit. In 2020, Focal introduced the Flax Evo, a new line of audio kits that builds upon the Flax line by integrating the TMD suspension and TAM tweeter into the Flax Evo. Furthermore, the brand expanded its expertise to produce kits for motorcycles and boats, offering a comprehensive and high-performance Motorities collection.
- Focal Professional: In 2002, a professional department called "Focal Professional" was established. It offered studio monitors specifically designed for recording studios. The product range consists of five lines: SM9, SM6, CMS, Shape, and Alpha, which were created for sound professionals and added in 2018. This range now accounts for 11% of the company's turnover. In 2024, the lineup included four series of monitors (ST6, SM6, Shape, and Alpha Evo), a range of subwoofers, and Listen Professional and Clear Mg Professional headphones.
- Integration line: Since 2007, Focal has offered "invisible" sound systems, In-Wall and In-Ceiling, to add sound to public and private places. In 2018, Focal introduced the 100 Series and 300 Series ranges designed for every room in the house. Over the following years, they expanded the Integration collection to include outdoor loudspeakers and equipment for sound in coastal or wet areas with Littora products. They also introduced the 100-T Series for large public spaces such as shops, restaurants, and hotels. In 2021, Focal unveiled the 1000 Series range, which features the Utopia excellence and includes directional loudspeakers, establishing it as the benchmark line of Focal integrated loudspeakers.
- Headphones: In 2012, Focal expanded into commercializing its first portable headphones, Spirit One, and then Spirit One S. The range was completed in 2013 with the Spirit Classic, a headphone intended for use at home, and the Spirit Professional. In 2015, Focal launched its very first in-ear headphones, named Sphear. In 2016, Focal introduced two high-end headphones, Elear and Utopia, both made in their workshop in France, then the Focal Clear headphones. 2017 marked the arrival of a line of mobile wired and wireless headphones: Listen, Listen Wireless, Spark, Spark Wireless, and Sphear S. Focal launched its first high-end closed-back headphones made in France with Elegia followed by Stellia in 2018, and a DAC and amplifier for headphones named Arche. In 2022, Focal introduced its very first active noise reduction wireless headphones called Bathys, bringing Focal's high-fidelity sound to a portable headphone.

== Partnerships ==
=== Automotive partnerships ===
In 2016 and 2017, Focal collaborated with several French car manufacturers to equip production vehicles. The first vehicles were the Peugeot 3008 SUV, 5008 SUV,508 and SUV 2008, followed by the DS7 Crossback and DS3 Crossback by DS Automobiles.

Focal also participated in the rebirth of the Alpine brand with the A110.

Focal was also involved in the development of several concept cars for these brands such as the E-Tense, X E-Tense and E-Legend.

Focal has also partnered with manufacturers Opel and Rimac to provide audio for their vehicles.

=== Tournaire ===
Focal launched its first high-end, made-in-France headphones, collaborating with Tournaire jewelers to create a collector's piece. The Utopia headphones are customized with the Trilogy mark, the symbol of Tournaire jewelers, and are made of 18-karat gold and mounted with diamonds. Only 8 pieces are available.

=== Ubisoft ===
In September 2017, Focal signed a partnership with Ubisoft, a French video game publisher. For the release of Assassin's Creed Origins game, Focal launched two limited edition headphones: Listen Wireless and Utopia by Tournaire.

=== Théâtre Antique d'Orange ===
In 2023, Focal partnered with the Théâtre Antique d'Orange for the Odyssée Sonore show. The Bathys wireless noise-cancelling headphones are available to the public during this sound and light show.

=== Artistic Palace ===
The Artistic Palace complex in Paris is dedicated to musical and audiovisual creation. They chose Focal to equip their 11 recording studios with professional monitors and headphones.

== Figures ==
Focal-JMlab's turnover for 2016 was €53 million, 80% of which came from exports.

Distribution of turnover per continent in 2012:

- Europe : 57%
- America : 20%
- Middle East and Africa: 2,5%
- Asia/Oceania: 20,5%

The Focal brand is distributed in more than 160 countries worldwide.

Focal-JMlab employs over 300 people at its 187,292 ft2 (17,400 m2) facility in Saint-Étienne. The facility houses production, R&D, and management departments.

Vervent Audio Group recorded a turnover of €110 million in 2019 and had a workforce of 430 employees.

In 2022, the Vervent Audio group had sales of €156 million, and the Focal Powered by Naim network had over 40 shops worldwide.

In 2023, Focal achieved sales of over €90 million.

== See also ==
- List of studio monitor manufacturers
