= Naim Audio amplification =

British audio equipment manufacturer

A Naim Audio system rack

Naim Audio is a specialist British manufacturer of high-end audio amplifiers well known for their self described qualities of "pace, rhythm and timing".

The company has a sui generis approach to audio design, ignoring specifications and power ratings as indicators of the quality of an amplifier.

Naim's approach includes, but is not limited to, absence of tone controls, the use of the DIN connectors instead of the RCA connector used almost everywhere in the home audio equipment industry, and reliance on over-engineered external power supply units (PSU) to deliver current for musical transients.

The company's two-channel NAP 250 amplifier made its début in 1975.

== History ==
The company, established in 1973, is one of the best-known hi-fi manufacturers in the UK. Its first product was a power amplifier named NAP 160; this was soon followed by the NAC 12 pre-amplifier. Until 1985, Naim's activity was centred on audio amplifiers.

The two-channel NAP 250 power amplifier that made its début in 1975 is among Naim Audio's most well-known analogue products. Its basic circuit layout would be the model for its power amplifier range for more than 25 years, until the introduction of the flagship NAP 500 in 2000.

=== Philosophy ===
All of the early models were designed by Naim founder Julian Vereker, who wanted equipment that he himself and friends could enjoy listening through. He experimented with constituents of the sound reproduction chain: source components, amplifiers and loudspeakers. Received wisdom was that amplifiers were "straight wires with gain" that had no effect on the sound, but Vereker insisted that the performance of amplifiers on the market ranged from bad to abysmal.

Vereker took some 12 months to learn enough about electronics to design the first product initially for personal use, named the NAP 160. Vereker defined that the amplifier's premise was "to drive the loudspeaker with a musical signal such that I could compare the sound with live music and get the same degree of enjoyment", and then determined that the amplifier must be able to drive loudspeakers' "widely varying impedance under musical conditions" without information loss.

== Design principles ==
=== Audio circuitry ===
Vereker believed that loss of information, often due to overload protection, was a damaging type of distortion that amplifiers were vulnerable to. Vereker attempted to reduce information loss at the design stage, by unconventionally disregarding test-bench measurements of harmonic distortion performance and output into a static resistive load. Naim says that to achieve amplifiers with low harmonic distortion, low noise, wide power-bandwidth, and constant dynamic output impedance, they pay attention to balancing dynamic impedance, open-loop bandwidth, slew rate, and propagation delay; the amplifiers are not subject to slew-rate limitation between 5 Hz and 50 kHz.

Vereker believed that a properly designed amplifier would not need tone controls, since these filters were often palliatives for poor design. He contended that tone controls represented a cost of manufacture yet were detrimental to sound quality. Therefore, starting with the NAC 12, Naim amplifiers have never featured the tone controls that were popular elsewhere in the industry.

Vereker considered Naim amplifiers belong to the "class B" category where bias current is minimised. He believed that "class A" design was wasteful and masked significant design issues. (Note: On 29 March 1998 03:55 AM, Julian Vereker said: "All Naim power amps are class B and they have as low a bias as we can manage, just a few milliamps." He gave two reasons for this: "to make a good push/pull power amp, the two halves need to match very closely since there is only one common feedback loop—this applies whatever the 'class' of the amp. If one achieves this degree of precision then one only needs a very small bias current." "Also it is extremely wasteful of resources making class A power amps, since they use large amounts of electricity even when they are not playing music, [and] this means the waste heat has to be dissipated into the atmosphere without overheating the components and thus shortening their lives, which implies large heatsinks, big heavy and expensive in terms of resources pieces of equipment.")

Electrically, the pre-amplifiers are bandwidth-limited, and while Naim is open to the possibility that users might match their pre-amps with another make of power amplifier, Naim warns against using other makes of pre-amplifiers with Naim power amplifiers, arguing that the former define the operating parameters of the latter and guarantee its stability. In practice, modern products' bandwidth has been much extended, but the pre- and power-amplifiers are of such a tight operational fit and sonic synergy that they are rarely used with other makes.

=== Power source ===
Naim has from the outset externalised pre-amplifiers' power source, unlike other manufacturers, citing the undesirability of having AC and transformers' powerful magnetic field near sensitive pre-amplifier circuitry – the "key point of separates". Its over-engineered power supplies, aimed at ensuring adequate 'headroom' (ample reserves of power) for transients, are equally well-known. Naim strongly believes that an ample source of power is of the greatest importance, and the availability of external PSUs to accompany its products also reflects the philosophy. The performance of most of its pre-amplifier range benefits from adding one of a number of power supplies, which provide permutations for upgrading.

=== Output protection ===
Vereker also believed that a well-designed amplifier must be stable at all times when driving real-life loads, which are different from those achieved in lab conditions because loudspeakers' impedances vary with frequency. The inherent compromise between the pursuits for stability and sound quality means that Naim's power amplifiers are designed to work optimally with its own moderately priced NAC A5 speaker cable, and its predecessor NAC A4. Product manuals warn users against using "high-definition wire or any other special cable between amplifier and loudspeaker". Whilst other manufacturers habitually employ Zobel networks (or an output filter which enhances amplifiers' stability) to protect against use with speakers and or cables with very high-capacitance, Naim amplifiers routinely omit these filters because of their adverse effect on sound quality. The design decision was made to use a suitable length of speaker cable (a minimum of 3.5m, with 5m being optimal) to provide the effective inductance.

=== Isolation ===
There has been a trickle-down of research from flagship models, particularly since the launch of the 5-Series. Subtle mechanical and electronic changes introduced in lower-rung products — as a result of research at the flagship product level — have contributed to build and sound quality: control of internal heat dissipation, wiring, radio-frequency interference and mechanical vibration through more efficient materials, compliant mounting and decoupling.

Naim have found that, with increasing amounts of digital circuitry in their boxes, the electronics are much more susceptible to microphony and other mechanical vibration. Inside the top-of-the-range NAC 552 pre-amplifier, the circuit boards are weighted down and have their own suspensions, and there are transit bolts to secure the suspended boards during transport. The rear-mounted mains switch and IEC socket are decoupled to mitigate microphonic effects. The NAIT XS, launched in late 2008, is the first Naim device to use a new bayonet PCB-mounting technique to "float" the circuitry. Also during the development of the NAP 500, Naim discovered that transformers and the power supply electronics in close proximity to audio circuitry also affects power amplifiers. Their top models – the NAP 300 and the NAP 500 – now externalise power supplies in separate cases.

Back-lit Naim Audio logo

=== Styling ===
In terms of styling, the amplifiers up until 1989 are constructed of heavy aluminium extruded cases that act as heat sinks; these were painted black with a metallic silver brim – thus nicknamed "chrome bumper" range. The pre-amplifiers are housed in "half-size" (Note: the "half-size" aluminium "shoe-box" measures 276 by 205 by 76 millimetres (10.9 in × 8.1 in × 3.0 in)) while most of the power amplifier range was housed in full-size cases. In 1989, the range was given a new look using the same sturdy aluminium cases but with a new olive-coloured fascia panel which also had a back-lit logo. Another facelift for the range came in 2002. The 2013 range of Naim equipment has aluminium chassis and sleeves; the fascia is die-cast zinc.

1989 olive casing (NAC 82)

1993 slimline olive casing (NAIT3)

2002 look

=== Construction ===
Reviewers of early Naim amplifiers criticised the distinctly "cottagey" styling, yet recognised that the money was spent on "what lies within". A review of Naim's first pre-amplifier observed its home-made appearance, saying: "the quality of mechanical construction is good, its over-all design appears to be of a utilitarian nature with little concession to visual styling." In 2009, veteran hi-fi critic Malcolm Stewart noted that the communicative sound and minimalist design have been enduring characteristics of the entire range of Naim amplifiers since the inception of the firm.

Back of a NAIT 3 integrated amplifier, showing the 4 DIN sockets and 1 pair of RCA sockets

For its power amplifiers and PSUs, Naim have used for many years toroidal transformers supplied by Holden & Fisher, custom-made to Naim's design and specification. They source toroids from Nuvotem Talema in Ireland since H&F ceased trading in 1993.

Of modular construction, the various elements of the amplification and power supply circuitry are in form of plug-in boards. The phono stage is made up of dedicated boards, of which there were three variants matched to gain characteristics and electrical loading from different phono cartridges.

There is no assembly line. Naim assembly staff build each piece of equipment in individual workstations from basic components and sub-assemblies, wire the product mostly by hand and progressively test to ensure compliance. Each component leaves the factory only if it passes a listening test. Ian White observed that the typical Naim product is "meticulously laid out, clean, and well put together".

==== Connectors ====
Naim's choice of connectors is part of its objective of achieving the Naim sound. Pre-amplifiers employ the BNC connector for phono inputs, as providing better impedance matching and earthing compared with RCA connectors. (Note: According to JV, the impedance of the majority of arm cables is between 60–80 ohms, close to that of the BNC's 50–75 ohms; the RCA connector's impedance of around 220 ohms creates a "step" in the path of the signal and causes electrons to reflect, with very audible consequences.) The DIN connector is also used in preference to the RCA connector for other inputs, as the DIN connectors help to ensure the equipment is properly earthed without multiple pathways that create hum-inducing earth loops and increase noise. Vereker noted that the cheapest RCA sockets were used with earlier designs as there was no sonic benefit to using the costlier DIN plugs, and that higher quality sockets were progressively substituted as systems improved. While Naim's practice of using DIN connectors has gained them fans and detractors alike, DIN sockets continue to be Naim's choice for line-level inputs, although some RCA inputs may be included, depending on the model.

On their power amplifiers, Naim use recessed loudspeaker sockets that accept only banana plugs. Use of forks or bare wire-connectors for speaker output was ruled out from the beginning, even though this is standard practice elsewhere. Reviewers complained about "nasty little [banana plug] sockets" used for the amplifiers. Naim's own NAC A5 speaker wire occasionally comes in for criticism for its physical stiffness, and also for imparting a "brittle, scratch" quality to the sound.

=== Sound aspects ===
The Naim sound is frequently described as possessing pace, rhythm, and timing (often referred to by the acronym "PRaT" (Note: In the mid to late 1970s, the acronym may have variously stood for "Pace, Rhythm and Timing", "Pitch, Rhythm and Timing" or "Pace, Rhythm and Tune")). Naim have always valued the ability of a piece of equipment to communicate emotion in music more than sound purity, and PRaT is a synonym of that ability. Julian Vereker saw that there was room within hi-fi circles for subjective preferences, but he held that it was "totally wrong" to put presentation (i.e. soundstage, detail, and depth and imagery) ahead of content. And while Naim does not set out to achieve imaging and soundstaging as design goals, reviewers have noted that some of the equipment is capable of delivering on these.

Naim amplifiers are well known for their ability to "consistently produce a tremendous sense of power and dynamics that belies their conservative power ratings". However, and although each piece of equipment is given a thorough soak test and auditioned before it leaves the factory, the equipment never gives optimal performance straight out of the box, and has a tendency to harshness when cold. Once the electronics have had the chance to "burn in", its sound mellows and becomes more fluid and communicative. Reviewers will usually allow the test equipment to warm up for days, if not weeks, before delivering their final assessment of the product.

== Power amplifiers ==
Product	Introduced	History/change(s)
NAP 160	1971	New case (1980), discontinued (1986)
NAP 200	1973	Replaced by NAP 250 (1975)
NAP 250	1975	New case (1980), Olive (1989), upgraded and new look (2002)
NAP 120	1978	Replaced by NAP 110 (1979)
NAB 300	1979	Discontinued (1984)
NAP 110	1979	Discontinued (1987)
NAP 140	1986	Discontinued (2002)
NAP 90	1987	Olive case (1989), superseded by NAP 90/2 (1990)
NAP 90/2	1990	Replaced by NAP 90/3
NAP 180	1992	Replaced by NAP 200 (2002)
NAP 90/3	1993	Discontinued (2002)
NAP 500	2000	
NAP 150	2001	Replaced by NAP 150x (2004)
NAP 175	2002	
NAP 200	2002	
NAP 300	2002	
NAP 150x	2004	Replaced by NAP 155 XS (2009)
NAP 155 XS	2009	
NAP 100	2013	
NAP 135	1984	Mono: Olive case (1989), discontinued (2002)

Naim power amplifiers are given numbers according to their power output into nominal load of 4 ohms. The company's first amplifier, the NAP 160, is a two-channel power amplifier with an output of 60 watts per channel; the NAP 135, which is a one-channel amplifier based on the same design as the NAP 250 rated at 135 watts. A custom-built very fast and heavy-duty TO3 transistor device was employed in the original Naim amplifiers.

Inside a monoblock chrome NAP 135

The NAP 250, based on the NAP 200 design and released in 1975, had remained "virtually unchanged 18 years later"; and was still going strong after 25 years. In early product manuals, recognising that good results required high current amplification, Linn recommended using the Isobarik PMS tri-amped with Naim amplifiers. Early on, three NAP 250 amplifiers, fed by a 3-way NAXO electronic crossover, would typically be used, one for each stereo pair of the doubled-up treble, midrange and bass driver units. The monaural NAP 135 can be used in a "6-pack" configuration (i.e. six amplifiers, three for each speaker).

In the late 1990s, still under Vereker's guidance, Naim developed a new flagship power amplifier using computer simulation and the latest transistor technology. Search for a transistor with the desired sonic characteristics led Naim to Semelab, who had created a device working at a combination of higher current and lower operating voltage. To accommodate the operating parameters, Naim opted for a bridge-mode topology. The output devices chosen, rated at 350W–70amp, are used singly within the amplifiers well within safe operating parameters; the use of protection relays, detrimental to sound quality, is thereby avoided. However, having the power supply in the same case was found detrimental to the sound quality, so the PSU is located in a separate alloy enclosure, linked to the amplifier by sturdy cables with locking connectors. The NAP 500, capable of delivering in excess of 200 watts per channel into 4 ohms, was launched in 2000. The NAP 300, launched two years later, is very similar to the NAP 250, but with a separate box PSU, according to authoritative hobbyist website Acoustica. Since the development work on the NAP 500, all amplifiers from NAP 200 upwards use the very costly "NA007" (re-badged from Semelab) output transistor.

As at April 2013, Naim have a range of six power amplifiers at various price points between £650 and £18,000.

== Pre-amplifiers ==
Product	Introduced	History/change(s)
NAC 12	1974	Discontinued (1980)
NAC 22	1976	Replaced by NAC 42 (1979)
NAC 32	1977	New case (1980)
NAC 32	1977	Became NAC 32-5 (1985)
NAC 32-5	1985	Replaced by NAC 72 (1989)
NAC 42	1979	Became NAC 42-5 (1985)
NAC 42-5	1985	Replaced by NAC 62 (1988)
NAC 52	1990	Replaced by NAC 252 (2002)
NAC 62	1988	Replaced by NAC 92 (1993)
NAC 72	1989	Discontinued (2000)
NAC 82	1992	Replaced by NAC 282 (2002)
NAC 92 & 92R	1993	(R = remote control). Discontinued (2000)
NAC 102	1996	Replaced by NAC 202 (2002)
NAC 112	2001	Replaced by NAC 122x (2006)
NAC 122x	2006	Replaced by NAC 152 XS (2009)
NAC 152 XS	2009	
NAC 202	2002	
NAC 252	2002	
NAC 282	2002	
NAC 552	2002	

Naim pre-amplifiers (or "control amplifiers" in Naim parlance) are given numbers according to their design sequence; as they are 2-channel designs, the number always ends in a "2". Thus company's first amplifier was named NAC 12. When the company upgraded the range in 2002, the NAC 102, NAC 82 and NAC 52 pre-amplifiers were given new names beginning with "2", thus becoming the NAC 202, NAC 282 and NAC 252 respectively; a flagship 5-Series "cost-no-object" amplifier launched also that year was given the designation NAC 552.

The pre-amplifiers are designed to accept signals from source components without overloading, and Naim claims total stability and a very wide open-loop bandwidth. The half-size pre-amplifiers were modular, consisting of a mother board for higher-level signals into which are plugged various daughter boards that deal with lower-level signals such as phono and tape. Phono boards are plug-in modules to provide for the gain and equalisation of the cartridge output to line level, and some of the earlier pre-amplifiers may be suffixed with "N", "S", or "K" depending on the phono boards carried. "S" and "K" are for low output moving coil cartridges (the latter being for cartridges requiring a higher impedance load), and the "N" for high output moving coil and moving magnet cartridges.

Power for the pre-amplifiers is drawn either from the 24V regulated feed from the power amplifier, or from independent power supplies. While being optional at the lower end, external power supplies are obligatory with the flagship models, from the NAC 52 (1990) to the NAC 552 (2002). The 552 was designed to work with an external PSU with an 800VA toroidal transformer that Naim says has enough capacity to supply a 300–400 W power amplifier. As at April 2013, Naim have a range of six pre-amplifiers at various price points between £1,050 and £18,250.

== Integrated amplifiers ==
Product	Introduced	History/change(s)
Nait	1983	Discontinued (1988)
Nait 2	1988	Replaced by Olive (1989), discontinued (1993)
Nait 3	1993	Discontinued (2000)
Nait 3R	1995	Discontinued (2000)
Nait 5	2000	Discontinued and replaced by Nait 5i (2003)
Nait 5i	2003	Upgraded to 'italic' spec (2007)
Nait 5i (italic)	2007	
Supernait	2007	
Nait XS	2008	

First-generation "chrome bumper" Naim Nait

As manufacturer of amplifier separates, Naim launched an integrated amplifier, the Nait, only in 1983 – the firm's tenth anniversary year. Naim decided that there was more to hi-fi than power ratings, and thus declined to disclose official power rating figures when the Nait was released. With it, Naim demonstrated that power-supply design in a small amp was important factor to sonic performance.

Between 1983 and 2007, Naim had only one integrated amplifier on offer, although it has seen several incarnations. Naim extended the range with the Supernait in 2007, and the XS a year later. Some of the incarnations provided an obvious upgrade path for their equipment by simply inserting an external power supply unit.

As at April 2013, the NAIT range consists of the entry-level Nait 5si and the top-of-the-range Supernait2, with the XS2 slotting in the middle. They are priced at between £875 and £2,825.

== Pre-amplifier power supplies ==
Product	Introduced	History/change(s)
NAPS	1975	Replaced by SNAPS (1978)
SNAPS	1978	Discontinued (1989)
HiCap	1984	Olive case (1989); Upgraded and new look (2002); DR specification (2012)
52PS	1990	Replaced by SuperCap (1995)
NAPSC	1992	Upgraded and new look (2002)
FlatCap	1994	Replaced by FlatCap2 (2000)
SuperCap	1995	New look (2002); DR specification (2012)
FlatCap2	2000	Replaced by FlatCap2x (2004)
FlatCap2x	2004	Replaced by FlatCap XS (2009)
FlatCap XS	2009	

Naim pre-amplifiers do not have on-board power, but are designed to be powered either from a dedicated feed from the PSU inside the power amplifier, or directly from an independent external PSU. This is done so that the sensitive pre-amps, running at extremely very low voltages and currents, are not adversely affected by the hum field induced by the power supply. Power units have multiple separate secondary windings dedicated to supplying the various sections of the preamp that they feed. However, the NAP 250, NAP 135 and NAP 300 power amplifiers do not have provision to power pre-amplifiers, so a PSU is mandatory.

Power supply units' given names are often acronyms or abbreviations. "NAPS" stands for Naim Audio Power Supply, and its successor was called "SNAPS", being short for Super Naim Audio Power Supply. "Hi-Cap" is an abbreviation for High Capacity Power Supply. Power supplies are connected to the preamps and amplifiers with a "SNAIC" – Super Naim Audio Interconnect Cable – terminated at both ends with DIN plugs.

The Flat Cap, Hi-Cap and Super Cap are, in order of increasing sophistication and cost, external power supply units produced by Naim for powering their pre-amplifiers, and are supplied with Naim's own DIN-terminated SNAICs. Most pre-amplifier models and some NAIT models offer the possibility of performance upgrade by introducing one of these power supplies to drive the pre-amplifier section. In addition to powering pre-amplifiers (NAIT XS, SUPERNAIT, NAC 152 XS, NAC 202, NAC 282), the Hi-Cap can be used for other Naim equipment such as phono and headphone amplifiers (StageLine, SuperLine, HeadLine), the NAT05 XS tuner, and electronic crossovers (SNAXO 242, SNAXO 362). The top-of-the-range Super Cap has thirteen independent 24V feeds for audio circuitry and one 12V supply for digital control circuitry, and can be used for any Naim pre-amplifier (except for the NAC 552, which has its own dedicated PSU); the NAC 252 alone makes full use of its multiple power feeds.

In 2012, Naim launched power supplies incorporating new "discrete Regulator" circuitry that had been under development for two years. The most radical change is the replacement of the long-standing LM317 [integrated circuit] regulator with discrete components. Claimed benefits are improved impulse signal recovery; signal-to-noise ratios are said to be better by an order of 15–30 dB. The manufacturer offers retrofitting service to equipment from the Hi-Cap upwards. As at April 2013, Naim have a range of four amplifier power supplies at various price points between £775 and £5,725.
