= Bi-wiring =

Method of running wires to speakers

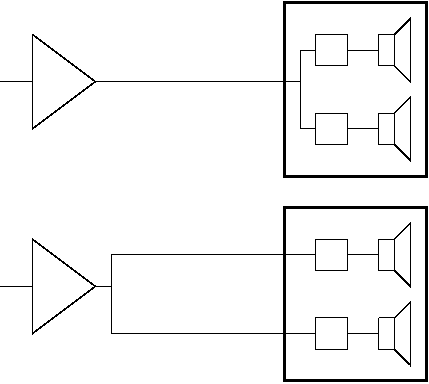
Amplifier and loudspeaker with two elements and crossover networks. Top: normal connection. Bottom: bi-wiring.

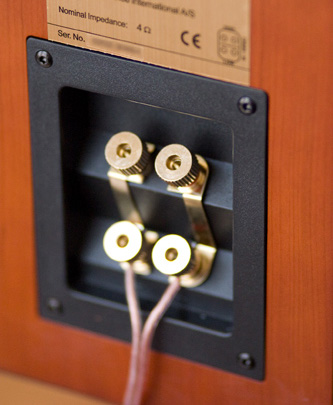
A 4-ohm loudspeaker with two pairs of binding posts capable of accepting bi-wiring after the removal of two metal straps

Bi-wiring is a means of connecting a loudspeaker to an audio amplifier, primarily used in hi-fi systems. Normally, there is one pair of connectors on a loudspeaker and a single cable (two conductors) runs from the amplifier output to the terminals at the loudspeaker housing. From this point, connections are made to the loudspeaker drivers – usually through audio crossover networks.

In bi-wiring, each loudspeaker has two pairs of connectors and two cables are run from the same amplifier output to the speaker cabinet: one for the high frequency or tweeter driver and one for the low-frequency driver (through two separated crossover filters). The purported advantage of this split is that it "reduces magnetic interaction in the cable, resulting in better sound". However, technical analysis suggests that while bi-wired arrangements may be expected to have differences from single wired ones, these differences would normally be so small as to have little significance.

Some audiophiles feel that bi-wiring produces an audible improvement over standard single cabling. For example, John Atkinson, writing in Stereophile, states that he observes "subtle but important" differences, particularly in reduction of treble hardness and improvement in bass control in one review.

Critics of bi-wiring believe that both ways of making speaker connections are electrically equivalent (assuming no difference in speaker cable resistance), and thus cynically refer to the practice as "buy-wiring", implying it is nothing more than a marketing gimmick for buying more pairs of speaker wires.

Bi-wiring should not be confused with the hi-fi practice of bi-amping: the use of a separate amplifier for each driver, which brings improved separation of signal frequencies and removes the need for passive crossovers and the degraded efficiency, linearity, and cost that comes with them.
