= Powered speakers =

Loudspeaker that have built-in amplifiers

An active full-range loudspeaker

Powered speakers, also known as self-powered speakers and active speakers, are loudspeakers that have built-in amplifiers. Powered speakers are used in a range of settings, including in sound reinforcement systems (used at live music concerts), both for the main speakers facing the audience and the monitor speakers facing the performers; by DJs performing at dance events and raves; in private homes as part of hi-fi or home cinema audio systems and as computer speakers. They can be connected directly to a mixing console or other low-level audio signal source without the need for an external amplifier. Some active speakers designed for sound reinforcement system use have an onboard mixing console and microphone preamplifier, which enables microphones to be connected directly to the speaker.

Active speakers have several advantages, the most obvious being their compactness and simplicity. Additionally the amplifier(s) can be designed to closely match the optimal requirements of the speaker it will power; and the speaker designer is not required to include a passive crossover, decreasing production cost and possibly sound quality. Some also claim that the shorter distances between components can decrease external interference and increase fidelity; although this is highly dubious, and the reciprocal argument can also be made. Disadvantages include heavier loudspeaker enclosures; reduced reliability due to active electronic components within; and the need to supply both the audio signal and power to every unit separately, typically requiring two cables to be run to each speaker (as opposed to the single cable required with passive speakers and an external amplifier).

Powered speakers are available with passive or active crossovers built into them. Since the early 2000s, powered speakers with active crossovers and other DSP have become common in sound reinforcement applications and in studio monitors. Home theater and add-on domestic/automotive subwoofers have used active powered speaker technology since the late 1980s.

== Differences ==
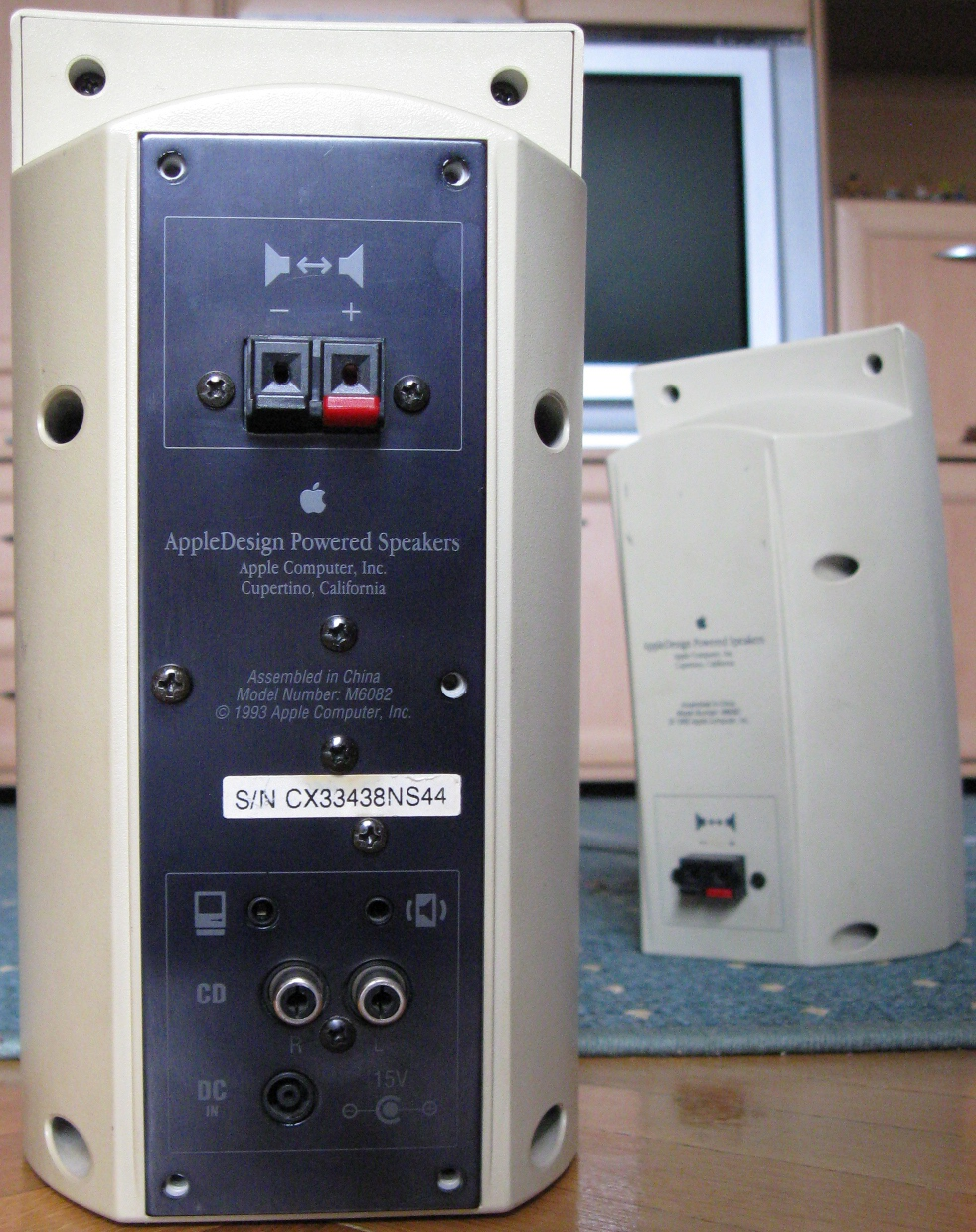
A powered computer speaker.

The terms "powered" and "active" have been used interchangeably in loudspeaker designs, however, a differentiation may be made between the terms:

- In a passive loudspeaker system the low-level audio signal is first amplified by an external power amplifier before being sent to the loudspeaker where the signal is split by a passive crossover into the appropriate frequency ranges before being sent to the individual drivers. This design is common in home audio as well as professional concert audio.
- A powered loudspeaker works the same way as a passive speaker, but the power amplifier is built into the loudspeaker enclosure. This design is common in compact personal speakers such as those used to amplify portable digital music devices.
- In a fully active loudspeaker system each driver has its own dedicated power amplifier. The low-level audio signal is first sent through an active crossover to split the audio signal into the appropriate frequency ranges before being sent to the power amplifiers and then on to the drivers. This design is commonly seen in studio monitors and professional concert audio.
- A powered loudspeaker usually used AC power or AC adapter; A passive loudspeaker usually had no power input or use low power input (such as USB power).

Hybrid active designs exist such as having three drivers powered by two internal amplifiers. In this case, an active two-way crossover splits the audio signal, usually into low frequencies and mid-high frequencies. The low-frequency driver is driven by its own amplifier channel while the mid- and high-frequency drivers share an amplifier channel, the output of which is split by a passive two-way crossover.

=== Integrated active systems ===
The term "active speakers" can also refer to an integrated "active system" in which passive loudspeakers are matched to an external system of multiple amplifiers fed by an active crossover. These active loudspeaker systems may be built for professional concert touring such as the pioneering JM-3 system designed in 1971 by Harry McCune Sound Service, or they may be built for high-end home use such as various systems from Naim Audio and Linn Products.

== History ==
Some of the first powered loudspeakers were JBL monitor speakers. With the addition of the SE401 Stereo Energizer, introduced in 1964, any pair of monitor speakers could be converted to self-powered operation with the second speaker powered by the first. The first studio monitor with an active crossover was the OY invented 1967 by Klein + Hummel. It was a hybrid three-way design with two internal amplifier channels. An early example of a bi-amplified powered studio monitor is the Altec 9846B, introduced in 1971, which combined the passive 9846-8A speaker with the new 771B Bi-amplifier with 60 watts for the woofer and 30 watts for the high frequency compression driver. In the late 1970s, Paramount Pictures contracted with AB Systems to design a powered speaker system.

In 1980, Meyer Sound Laboratories produced an integrated active 2-way system, the passive UPA-1, which incorporated lessons John Meyer learned on the McCune JM-3. It used active electronics mounted outside of the loudspeaker enclosure, including Meyer's integrated active crossover with feedback comparator circuits determining the level of limiting, often connected to third-party customer-specified amplifiers. In 1990, Meyer produced its first powered speaker: the HD-1, a 2-way studio monitor with all internal electronics. In the early '90s, after years of dealing with the disadvantages of passive systems, especially varying gain settings on third-party amplifiers, John Meyer decided to stop making passive speakers and devote his company to active designs. Meyer said he "hired an ad agency to research how people felt about powered speakers for sound reinforcement, and they came back after a survey and said that nobody wanted them." Sound reinforcement system operators said they did not want loudspeakers in which they could not see the amplifier meters to determine whether the loudspeakers were working properly during a concert. Nevertheless, Meyer kept to his decision and produced the MSL-4 in 1994, the first powered loudspeaker intended for concert touring. The UPA-1 was converted to a self-powered configuration in 1996 and the rest of Meyer's product line followed suit.

== Advantages and disadvantages ==
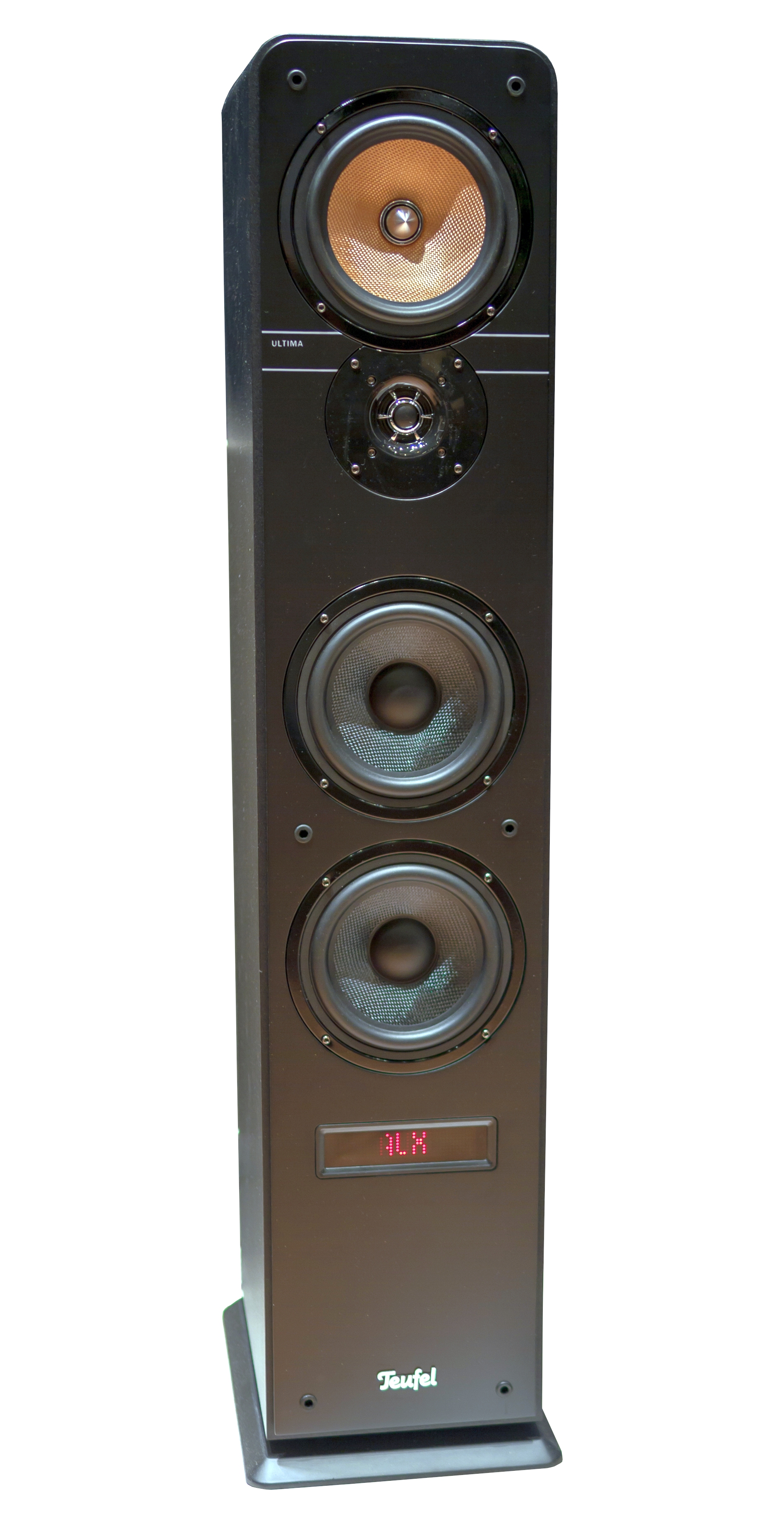
Powered speaker Teufel Audio Ultima 40 Aktiv (2018), a typical mid-sized powered loudspeaker box.

=== Fidelity ===
The main benefit of active versus passive speakers is in the higher fidelity associated with active crossovers and multiple amplifiers, including less IMD, higher dynamic range and greater output power. The amplifiers within the loudspeaker enclosure may be ideally matched to the individual drivers, eliminating the need for each amplifier channel to operate in the entire audio bandpass. Driver characteristics such as power handling and impedance may be matched to amplifier capabilities. More specifically, active speakers have very short speaker cables inside the enclosure, so very little voltage and control is lost in long speaker cables with higher resistance.

An active speaker often incorporates equalization tailored to each driver's response in the enclosure. This yields a flatter, more neutral sound. Limiting circuits (high-ratio audio compression circuits) can be incorporated to increase the likelihood of the driver surviving high-SPL use. Such limiters may be carefully matched to driver characteristics, resulting in a more dependable loudspeaker requiring less service. Distortion detection may be designed into the electronics to help determine the onset of protective limiting, reducing output distortion and eliminating clipping.

=== Cabling ===
Passive speakers need only one speaker cable but active speakers need two cables: an audio signal cable and an AC power cable. For multiple-enclosure high-power concert systems, the AC cabling is often smaller in diameter than the equivalent speaker cable bundles, so less copper is used. Some powered speaker manufacturers are now incorporating UHF or more frequently Wi-Fi wireless receivers so the speaker requires only an AC power cable.

=== Weight ===
A powered speaker usually weighs more than an equivalent passive speaker because the internal amplifier circuitry usually outweighs a speaker-level passive crossover. A loudspeaker associated with an integrated active system is even lighter because it has no internal crossover. A lightweight loudspeaker can be more easily carried and it is less of a load in rigging (flying). However, active speakers using lightweight Class-D amplifiers have narrowed the difference. Trucking for a sound system involves transporting all of the various components including amplifier racks, speaker cabling and loudspeaker enclosures. Overall shipping weight for an active loudspeaker system may be less than for a passive system because heavy passive speaker cable bundles are replaced by lighter AC cables and small diameter signal cables. Truck space and weight is reduced by eliminating amplifier racks.

=== Cost ===
The expense of a large concert active speaker system is less than the expense of an equivalent passive system. The passive system, or integrated active system with external electronics, requires separate components such as crossovers, equalizers, limiters and amplifiers, all mounted in rolling racks. Cabling for passive concert systems is heavy, large-diameter speaker cable, more expensive than smaller diameter AC power cables and much smaller audio signal cables. For high-end home use, active speakers usually cost more than passive speakers because of the additional amplifier channels required.

=== Ease of use ===
In professional audio and some home cinema and hi-fi applications, the active speaker may be easier to use because it eliminates the complexity of properly setting crossover frequencies, equalizer curves and limiter thresholds. Cabling is not as simple, however, because active speakers require two cables instead of one (an AC power cable and a cable with the signal, typically an XLR cable). In home audio, some audio engineers argue that a passive speaker, in which an unpowered speaker is connected to an amplifier, is the easiest to install and operate.

=== Stability against improper use ===
The amplifiers are adapted to the single loudspeakers employed, which avoids damage to the amplifier or loudspeaker due to mismatched or overloaded components. In certain cases, with passive speakers, tweeters may be destroyed due to strong distortions resulting from amplifier clipping due to overload resulting in overheating. This particularly occurs when the loudness button on a conventional amplifier is activated and the bass tone control is also turned up while the listening volume is high, a typical situation when hi-fi speakers are used at private parties.

== Servo-driven speakers ==
By including a negative feedback loop in the amplifier-speaker system, distortion can be substantially reduced. If mounted at the speaker cone, the sensor is usually an accelerometer. It is possible to monitor the back emf generated by the driver voice coil as it moves within the magnetic gap. In either case, specialist amplifier designs are needed and so servo speakers are inherently powered speakers.

== Bass amplifiers ==
Some bass amplifier manufacturers sell powered speakers designed for adding to the stage power of a combo bass amp. The user plugs a patch cord or XLR cable from the combo amp into the powered speaker.
