= Julian Vereker =

British audio electronics designer (1945-2000)

- Vereker appearing in a publicity shoot for the Naim Label
- Born: 7 May 1945; Oxford, England
- Died: 14 January 2000 (aged 54)
- Occupation: electronics designer
- Known for: founder of Naim Audio

Julian Charles Prendergast Vereker MBE (7 May 1945 – 14 January 2000) was an English self-taught designer of audio equipment, and the founder of Naim Audio Ltd. of Salisbury, Wiltshire. He was an influential figure in the manufacture and retail of British high-fidelity audio equipment in the 1970s and 1980s.

== Biography ==
=== Family and education ===
Julian Vereker was born in Oxford, England. He was the great-great grandson of the 3rd Viscount Gort. His great-grandfather had been Consul at Cherbourg and his grandfather a naval commander; his father Charles became Professor of Political Theory at Durham University. Vereker therefore grew up in a lively academic family, which did not prevent him from becoming a rebellious adolescent in the 1960s. Though requiring four attempts to pass O Level mathematics, he developed a passion for engineering, left Bryanston School at 16. He attended technical college in Liverpool, followed by the College of Aero and Automobile Engineering in London.

=== Professional life ===
He co-founded Coburn Improvements, a company that custom modified sports and racing cars. He then made improvements to a Mini 850 S, which he raced for several seasons. In 1967, he participated in 23 races, of which he won 16 and placed in the rest. After that successful season, he decided to sell his car: it raised about £650 – a small fortune at the time. Vereker worked briefly for Downton Engineering and Janspeed but lost interest in cars. Pursuing his interest in reproduction of sound with 8 mm film, Vereker found that prices were high due to a dearth of supply, and built a machine to perforate recording tape capable of making 6 million feet a year.

Vereker founded Naim Audio Visual in 1969. Its first product was a unit capable of switching 30 kW of lighting on and off in time to music.

Vereker loved making recordings of his friends but was unsatisfied with the results. Prevailing wisdom at the time was that all amplifiers sounded alike. However, he found this not to be true. Experimentation with pieces of equipment in the sound reproduction chain led him to conclude that amplifying equipment available at the time was of unsatisfactory quality: he could not distinguish different performers, or different kinds of guitar.

Working on building mixers based on other peoples' designs, he found that distortion – already visible in oscilloscope traces – and set out to eliminate it through better design. After a year of studying audio transistor circuitry and some experimentation, he decided to make his own amplifier equipment. His first professional audio product, launched in around 1970, was a small mixing desk – the M10.2. The first Naim Audio amplifier was sold in December 1971 – a power amplifier only made initially on demand for friends and acquaintances.

In 1973 Vereker won a contract to supply the nascent Capital Radio with 24 single cabinets containing the Naim amplifier and speaker drive units. That July, the company was incorporated as Naim Audio; and in 1974 the firm moved from a basement in Salisbury to a 16th-century shop in the city.

A pivotal event that same year was Vereker's introduction to a Scot, Ivor Tiefenbrun, who had been developing turntables. Impressed with Vereker's product, Ivor began firmly recommending Vereker's amplifiers when he promoted his turntable. Together, they challenged the perceived wisdom at the time within the industry, proving by demonstration alone that indeed all products were not the same. The Linn turntable, partnered with Naim amplifiers, proved to be an unbeatable combination, with sales greatly assisted by Vereker's and Tiefenbrun's confident pitch to potential customers: "If you can't hear the difference, it's not worth talking to you".

In the 1990s and right up to his death, the Naim record label was close to Vereker's heart, and he devoted his time to coming up with improved techniques for CD mastering. The roster featured many of his friends from the music world.

== Other achievements ==
For some years Vereker was chairman of the Federation of British Audio.

He was appointed an MBE in the 1995 Birthday Honours for services to British export.

== Interests and personal life ==
In addition to hi-fi, Vereker worked on cars, boats, computers and lighting systems.

He was an enthusiast for bicycle design, and assisted Brompton Bicycle, a start-up company making folding bicycles, with a £40,000 guarantee for its overdraft. Also passionate about sailing, he designed boats: working with boat manufacturer British Hunter, he developed a boat which he called the Windex 49. The prototype of his last venture, with a triangulated mast and a computer-controlled system of active water ballast, was launched on the day he died.

Vereker died from cancer on 14 January 2000, aged 54. He was twice married, and had a son and two daughters.
