= Bi-amping and tri-amping =

Use of multiple amplifiers for a loudspeaker

Bi-amping - An active crossover with two amplifiers.

Bi-amping and tri-amping is the practice of using two or three audio amplifiers respectively to amplify different audio frequency ranges, with the amplified signals being routed to different speaker drivers, such as woofers, subwoofers and tweeters. With bi-amping and tri-amping, an audio crossover is used to divide a sound signal into different frequency ranges, each of which is then separately amplified and routed to separate speaker drivers. In powered speakers using bi-amping, multiple speaker drivers are in the same speaker enclosure. In some bi-amp set-ups, the drivers are in separate speaker enclosures, such as with home stereos that contain two speakers and a separate subwoofer.

== Description ==
Illustration of tri-amping, using three amplifiers to amplify different parts of a sound.

Bi-amping is the use of two channels of amplification to power each loudspeaker within an audio system. Tri-amping is the practice of connecting three channels of amplification to a loudspeaker unit: one to power the bass driver (woofer), one to power the mid-range and the third to power the treble driver (tweeter). The terms derive from the prefix bi- meaning "two", tri- meaning "three", and amp the abbreviation for amplifier.

=== Crossover ===
It differs from the conventional arrangement in which each channel of amplification powers a single speaker. Bi-amping typically consists of a crossover network and two or more drivers. With ordinary loudspeakers, a single amplifier can power the woofer, mid-range and tweeter through an audio crossover, which filters the signal into high-, medium-, and low-frequencies (or high- and low-frequencies in 2-way speakers) – a mechanism that protects each driver from signals outside its frequency range. However, the passive crossover itself is inefficient, so splitting the frequencies electronically before these are amplified is a way to avoid this problem. In such a case, each amplifier powers a frequency range determined by an active crossover to each of the drive units. The technique is primarily used in large-scale audio applications such as sound amplification for concerts, in portable powered speakers and by hi-fi enthusiasts.

=== Wiring ===
A speaker system has to be wired to accommodate either configuration, typically with two sets of binding posts, one set for the bass and one set for the mid-highs. A single amplifier can usually power a woofer and a tweeter only through a post-amplifier crossover filter, which protects each driver from signals outside its frequency range.

Bi-amping of speakers requires double the channels of amplification and can be accomplished using two ordinary amplifiers in either a vertical or horizontal arrangement.

- Horizontal bi-amping uses one amplifier to power both bass drivers (woofers) and the second amplifier to power both treble drivers (tweeter) or the midrange and treble drivers together. Horizontal bi-amping has the advantage of allowing two different amplifiers that sound better than each other for bass or for treble.
- Vertical bi-amping uses two channels of an amplifier per loudspeaker, with a dedicated channel for the bass driver and a dedicated channel for the treble or the treble and the midrange post-amplifier together. Vertical bi-amping has the advantage of not having to use a single amp to power both bass sections, which can be very taxing on the amplifier, especially at higher volume or if the bass driver has a particularly low impedance at certain frequencies.

=== Benefits ===
Most audible differences are subtle. If at all noticeable, many benefits of bi-amping cannot be realized if passive crossover networks of a speaker system are not removed. Benefits include transients are less likely to cause amplifier overload (clipping) or speaker damage, and reduced intermodulation distortion, elimination of errors introduced by low-frequency passive crossover, reduction of load presented to the power amplifier, better matching of power amplifier and speaker driver and others. In large professional sound systems, Bi-amping is pretty much the norm with the greater benefits easily outweighing the costs. All speakers are two-way transducers and can introduce current back into the driving circuit from ambient sound. The driving amplifier tries to control the effect of this with its damping factor (having a high resistance to such current), but with a passive crossover, this current can still leak across to the other driver units in the circuit. A Bi-amped system is therefore able to better resist ambient sound feeding back into the circuit. With high volumes and larger venues, such ambient feedback can have a significant damaging effect to the overall sound.

== See also ==
- Bi-wiring
- Powered speakers
