= Naim Audio =

British hi-fi manufacturer

Naim Audio Limited
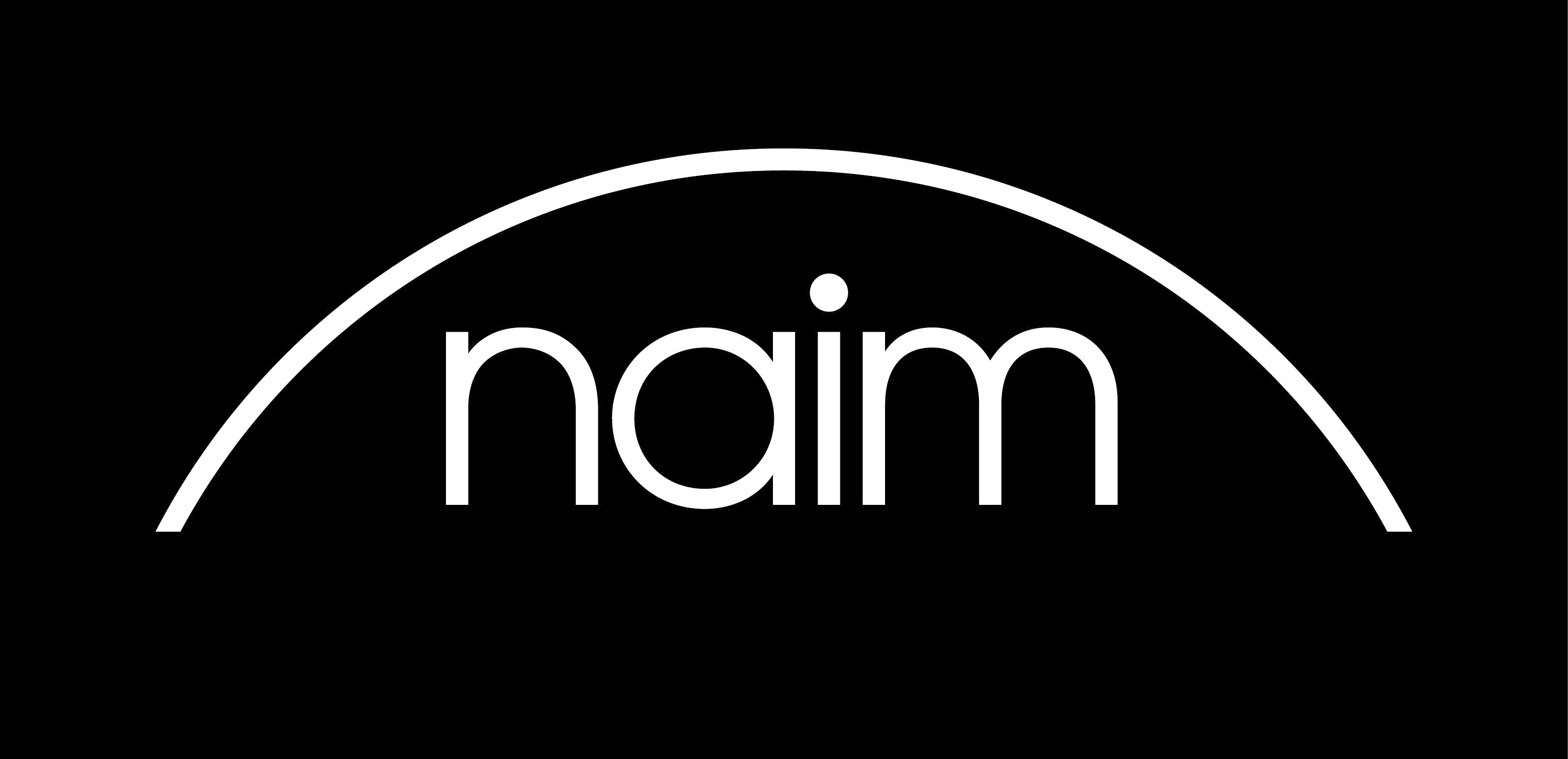
- Type: Private Limited Company
- Industry: High-end audio manufacture
- Founded: 4 June 1973
- Founder: Julian Vereker
- Headquarters: Salisbury, England, United Kingdom
- Key people: Cedric Magnaud (site director)
- Products: Digital music systems, amplifiers, CD players and loudspeakers
- Revenue: £41.8 million (in 2022)
- Owner: Vervent Audio Group
- Website: www.naimaudio.com

Naim Audio Limited is a British hi-fi manufacturer based in Wiltshire, United Kingdom.

The company was founded in 1973. Following a 2011 merger with French loudspeaker manufacturer Focal, Naim was owned by VerVent Audio Group. In the second quarter of 2026, the Belgian company Barco (known for its healthcare tech) bought VerVent Audio.

== History ==
Naim began when Julian Vereker started Naim Audio Visual in 1969 and created a sound-to-light box that he hired out to film production companies. He designed his own power amplifier. The company Naim Audio was incorporated in 1973. The convention at the time – dating back to audio pioneer Edgar Villchur – It was believed that the loudspeakers determined the sound of a hi-fi system, and amplifiers were simply a means to drive the speakers.

=== Amplifiers ===
The first product Naim put on the market was the NAP160 power amplifier; it was followed by the NAC12 pre-amplifier. The two-channel NAP 250 amplifier, launched in 1975, is perhaps Naim Audio's most well-known analogue product, as its basic circuit layout was shared by all the company's power amplifiers until the introduction of the NAP500 in 2000. The Naim NAIT, its first integrated amplifier, has been called "one of the most controversial and famous integrated amps in the history of HiFi".

In 2024, Naim introduced new products specifically designed for the Integration market: CI-NAP 108, CI-NAP 101, and CI-Uniti 102. These products include power amplifiers and streaming amplifiers, which are designed to complement Focal loudspeakers. In October 2024, Naim engineers developed custom electronics for the DIVA UTOPIA, Focal's first active, wireless, and connected speaker. The electronics feature class AB amplification, delivering 400 watts of power, and a new Naim Pulse Platform active module for high-resolution music streaming.

=== R&D ===
In 1983, Guy Lamotte was hired as a designer. He completed the development of the NA T01 and NAT101 FM tuners and piloted the development of the Hi-Cap power supply and the −5 modifications to the company's pre-amplification (NAC42 and 32), the NAXO active crossover and the ARO uni-pivot tonearm (developed jointly with David Beck). Lamotte privately worked on a prototype electrostatic speaker design. It was brought into the Naim fold in 1987, after the Linn/Naim partnership ended. Roy George, who joined in 1985 and was appointed Technical Director of Naim in 2000, has been credited with designing many of Naim's products.

In 2019, the parent company Vervent Audio Group expected to invest more than 8% of its sales revenue in research and development.

=== Following ===
The company, and its products such as the NAIT, NAC52 pre-amplifier, the ARO uni-pivot tonearm and the SBL (Separate Box Loudspeaker) have assumed cult status among devotees.

=== After Vereker ===
The company was headed by Vereker until his death in 2000, when Paul Stephenson, then Sales Director, became Managing Director until 2015. The company saw turnover increase from £6m to £20m and began digital streaming. Former R&D Director Trevor Wilson was managing director from 2015 to 2018. The business was then led by Charlie Henderson as managing director between 2018 and 2021, and by 2021 turnover had increased to £39 million, yielding profit before tax of nearly £5 million.

In 2022, Cedric Magnaud took over as the site director, and the brand's turnover reached 41.8 million pounds.

== Design characteristics ==
Internally, the Naim design approach can be seen by their use of materials –– the semiconductors, heavy toroidal transformers, their attention to earthing, screening and isolation from electronic and mechanical interference, through to their preference for XLR connector, DIN connector and the BNC connector for phono (as opposed to the RCA connector used by almost all other manufacturers).

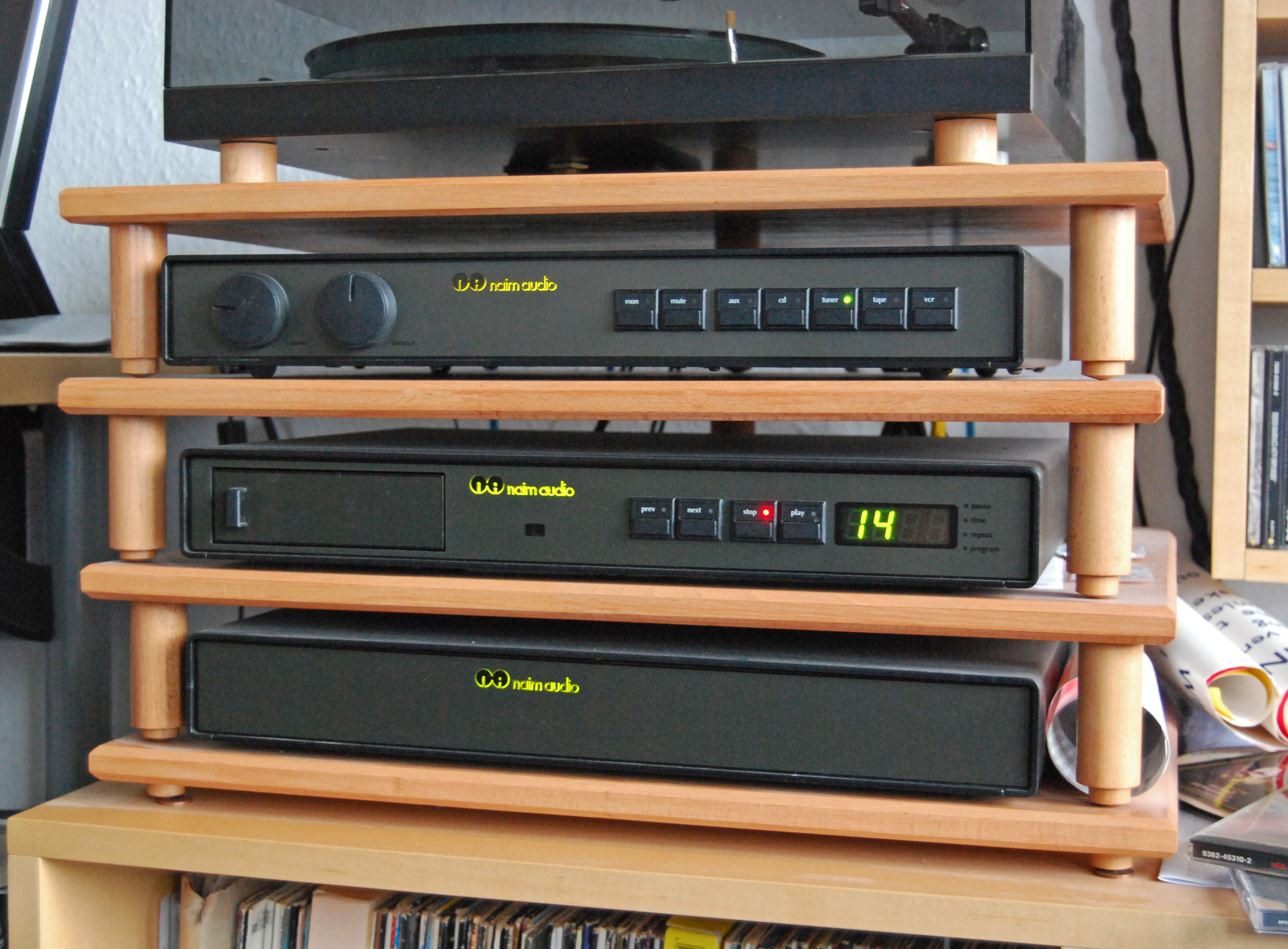
Naim design 1990 to 1999

Until 1989, the company's electronics could be identified by their heavy black aluminium casing. Since their replacement by the 'olive' range, the earlier vintages are known as 'chrome bumper' models. Electrically, the amplifiers are matched and designed to be used together. Naim warns against experimentation with other manufacturers' components, particularly in the case for some "high-end" loudspeaker cables, whose L/C characteristics were said by Naim to present unstable loads to the high-current devices used in Naim power amplifiers.

As with other brands such as Arcam and Cyrus, the company's instruction manuals state that "better and more consistent performance will be achieved if the system is left switched on for long periods." Reviewers have remarked on equipment sounding significantly better several weeks after being left switched on.

=== Digital audio ===
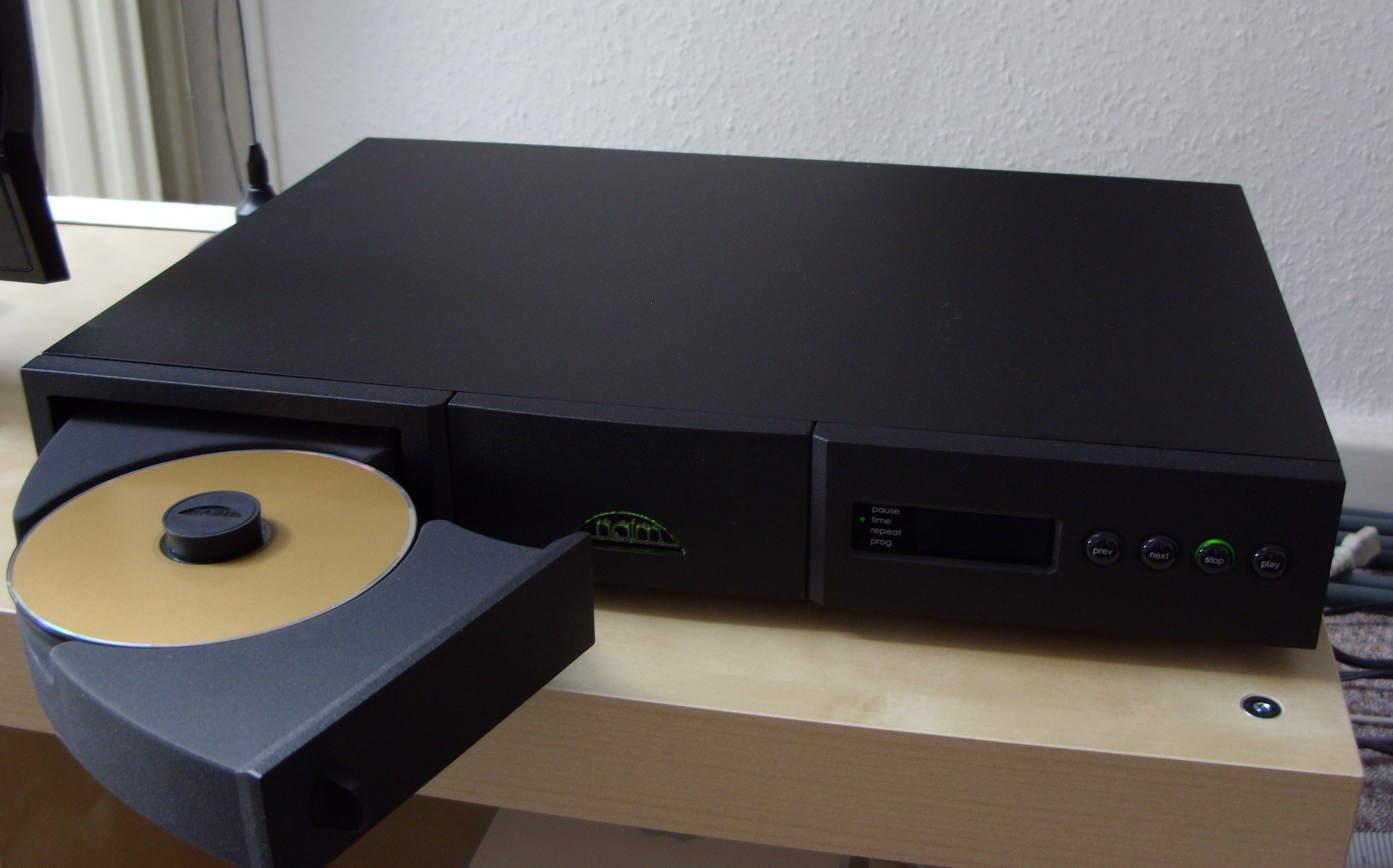
Naim CD 5

Throughout much of the 1980s, Naim maintained the position that the Compact Disc was an inferior medium compared to the vinyl gramophone record. This perspective guided Naim's product design during that period. The announcement in 1989 that the company was working on a CD player shocked the marketplace. The player, called the CDS, was unusual for a two-box device in that Naim put the digital–analogue converter in the same box as the transport and audio circuitry, whilst keeping the power supply separate. The player saw two major revisions, the CDS2 (1998) and CDS3 (2002). Naim also made several less expensive single-box players such as the CD 5 XS (2009). As of 2023, only the CD5si (introduced in 2012) continues to be made.

Naim's Uniti range, introduced in 2009, provides access to various digital streaming sources and services; these products contain power amplifiers and are connected to external speakers. The Uniti Atom received the EISA award for Best All in One System, 2018–19. The Mu-so range, introduced in 2014, has internal Focal speaker drivers.

The brand upgraded its Mu-so all-in-one speaker range with the unveiling of 'second generation' models in 2019: Mu-so 2nd Generation and Mu-so Qb 2nd Generation, the compact version. In January 2024, the Uniti all-in-one player range was enhanced with the Uniti Nova Power Edition model.

In 2023, Naim introduced an updated line of separate components called New Classic (200 and 300 Series), which includes an amplifier, preamplifier, and streamer/DAC. These devices can be combined to create an audiophile-quality audio system.

== Partnerships ==
Page of Naim Audio company calendar, February 1986, with image of founder Julian Vereker in a parody of a Mr Kipling advertising slogan

During much of the 1970s and 80s, Naim adopted a symbiotic relationship with Linn Products, and their names were often mentioned together.

The two companies had almost the same sales and marketing strategy, and shared many of the same retailers/dealers. Vereker, the company's founder, was active in marketing and promotion, and appeared in the company's advertising. The company's shift to selling products through comparative demonstrations in a single-speaker environment represented a departure from marketing in chain electronics stores in favour of small independent retailers [in the United Kingdom].

The two companies diverged during the 1980s. This was partly due to the convergence of technology, but also because Naim had significantly fewer dealers than Linn. This presented problems for Linn dealers trying to sell Linn speakers, that were specifically designed to work with Naim amplification. Both Naim and Linn began broadening their product ranges and started encroaching on each other's areas of expertise: in 1985, Linn launched its LK1/LK2 amplification combination, signalling the definitive end of the partnership. Naim began making loudspeakers and Linn expanded its range of electronic components. In 1987, Naim announced that chief designer Guy Lamotte had been working on a prototype electrostatic speaker design, and that a product launch was imminent. However, the product was never brought to fruition as it was cancelled due to escalating costs. In 1995, Naim announced the launch of the Armageddon power supply for the LP12.

In 2008, Naim partnered with car manufacturer Bentley in the "Naim for Bentley" project, an optional upgrade in-car sound system. Naim produced the audio systems for several of the manufacturer's models, including: Bentley Flying Spurs (2020), Bentley Continental GT and Bentley Bentayga.

To celebrate their exceptional partnership, in 2020, Naim and Focal introduced special edition products for Bentley Motors: the Mu-so for Bentley Special Edition all-in-one system and the Focal for Bentley Radiance hi-fi headphones. In the same year, Naim developed an audio system for the Battista hypercar by Automobili Pininfarina.

In 2023, Naim designed a top-of-the-range system for the Bentley's Mulliner division. The Batur, the most powerful car ever built by Bentley, was equipped with a Naim audio system comprising 20 loudspeakers manufactured by Focal.

Naim's expertise has been sought after by car manufacturers and also in the world of yachts. In 2017, the brand collaborated with Princess Yachts.

In 2010, Naim employed 140 staff, with products exported to at least 40 countries and half of its £15 million turnover coming from export. One-third of the business was from CD players. In 2011 and again in 2017, around 60 percent of sales went to export markets.

By 2016, the number of employees had increased to 170*, and later surpassed 200.

== Ownership ==
At the time of his death, Julian Vereker held half of the share capital of the company. The other half was owned by employees, including Paul Stephenson who owned 20 percent. Vereker bequeathed his shares to be held in a trust of which Stephenson is trustee.

=== 2011: Focal & Co ===
In August 2011, Naim and Focal-JMLab announced a merger of both companies. Focal & Co., the new entity to be formed to own the existing operations, would employ 325 people in total at two sites, in Saint Etienne, France, and Salisbury, UK. Pro-forma annual turnover of the new company was £48 million. The Naim and Focal brands would continue to operate independently, while collaborating on R&D.

The shareholders of Focal & Co are those that respectively owned the company prior to the merger (namely Jacques Mahul, CM-CIC and the management of Focal-JMLab and Naim), suggesting the merger being executed by an exchange of shares for shares in the holding company. No ownership statistics and no valuation were mentioned.

=== 2014: Vervent Audio Group ===
In May 2014, French investors Naxicap Partners and French private equity firm Aquasourca announced they had acquired a majority stake in the Focal & Co group, which was renamed to Vervent Audio Group.

In August 2017, Focal.JMLab UK Limited, the distributor of Focal speakers in the UK, was merged into Naim Audio Limited. In late 2019, Alpha Private Equity became the majority shareholder of Vervent, chaired by Cédrick Boutonet, who was appointed CEO. The subsidiaries Focal Naim America and Focal Naim Canada were also created. Naim Audio Limited continues to operate as a British company and as a subsidiary of Vervent. That same year, the rollout of a global network of 'Focal Powered by Naim' stores was launched, with the first openings in Seoul (South Korea) and Lyon (France). This was followed by the United States, England, Canada, and many others. These stores, shop-in-shops, and dedicated corners for the Focal and Naim brands offer customers a brand experience. The FPBN network includes more than 50 locations, spanning North America, Asia, and Europe.

In 2022, the turnover of the Vervent Audio group amounted to 156 million euros.

== Record label ==
Formed in 1993, Naim Records is the label arm of Naim Audio. The label was established by Julian Vereker, the founder of Naim, to release music with a focus on high quality recording and songwriting. The Naim Records catalogue is diverse, ranging from Sons of Kemet and Yazz Ahmed to Charlie Haden and Kurt Elling.
