= Magnepan =

American loudspeaker manufacturer

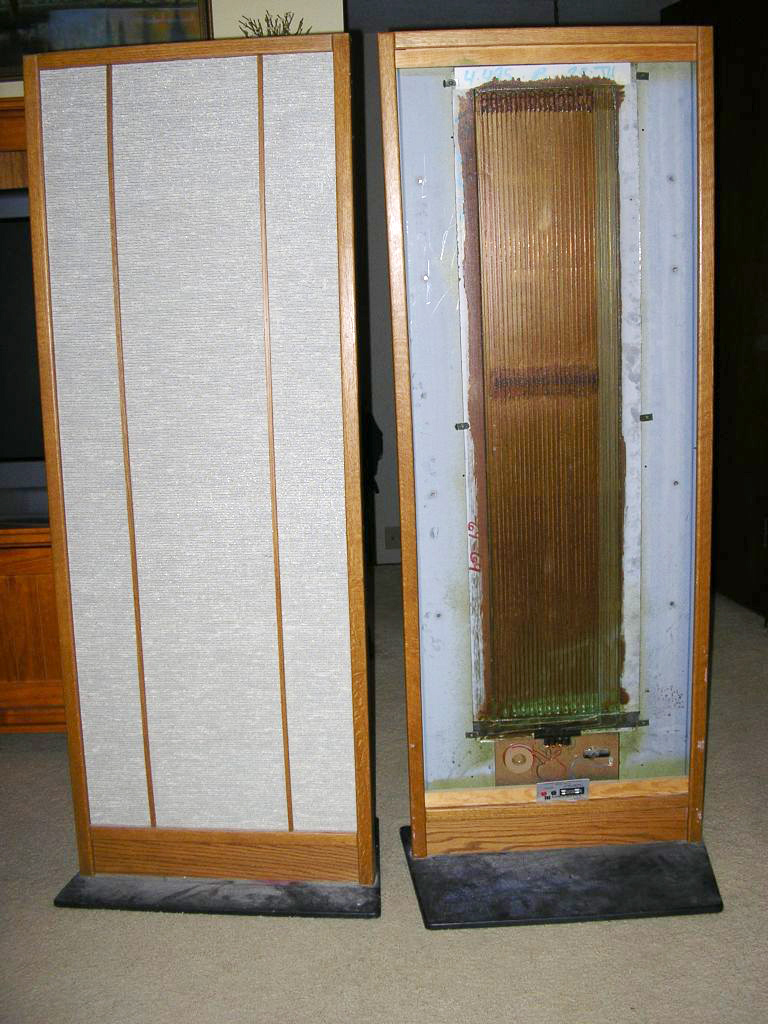
A pair of early Magneplanar MG-I speakers (circa 1976)

Magnepan is a private high-end audio loudspeaker manufacturer in White Bear Lake, Minnesota, United States. Their loudspeaker technology was conceived and implemented by engineer Jim Winey in 1969.

== Overview ==
Magnepan's speaker design, sold under the brand name Magneplanar (often referred to as "Maggies"), differs from that of conventional speakers in relying not on cones mounted in an enclosure, but on a planar driver system mounted in a panel. A Magneplanar's sound reproducing mechanism (magnetostatic loudspeaker) comprises thin conductive wires and or foil strips attached to a thin sheet of Mylar residing in a magnetic field created by a vertical array of permanent strip magnets. When an electric signal is applied to the conductors, the resultant electric current moving through the magnetic field applies a force to the wires or tape, moving the Mylar film sheet, which projects sound as a dipole. In principle, this approach relies on the same concept as a voice coil-driven cone speaker, but in a Magneplanar speaker the "voice coils" are attached (glued) directly to the radiating surface. Since the force is applied only to the voice coil in a cone speaker, there are distortion modes called cone breakup; in the magneplanar speakers the force is applied much more evenly over the radiating surface, resulting in fewer distortion modes.

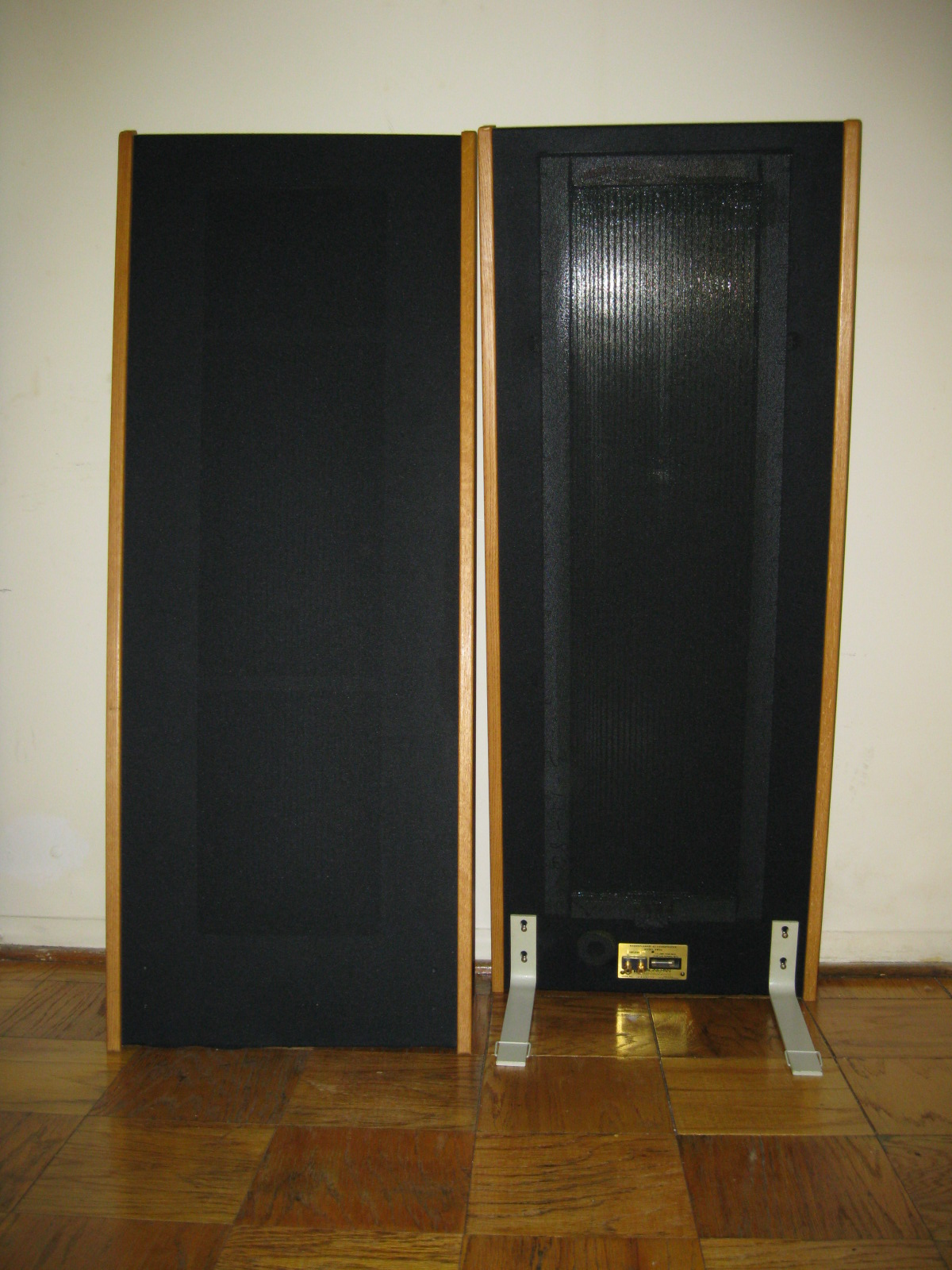
A pair of (restored) 1986 SMGa Magneplanars

Sound is projected from both the front and back of the radiating surface. The sound from the back of the speaker is reflected from the front wall of the listening area. This is said to effectively enhance the soundstage – the sense of space and realism – of the speaker. The Magneplanar design, using a passive magnet array, is not a unique loudspeaker implementation, although it was the first of its type. Eminent Technology, Analysis Audio, Apogee and others also employ passive magnet designs. Broadly, these are classed as planar-magnetic speakers.

There are other speaker designs similar to the Magneplanar. MartinLogan and Quad Electroacoustics, among others, make electrostatic loudspeakers, which are another variation on the dipole model. Electrostatic speakers operate on a somewhat different principle. While the voice coils in the Magneplanar are conductive wires or foil strips mounted on a sheet of Mylar film, electrostatic speakers suspend a charged conductive film between two grids (stators), which move the film. One disadvantage of both designs is that a very large panel is required to produce deep bass. Magnepan has addressed this by the physical size of the speakers – a physically large radiating surface produces more bass. MartinLogan has addressed the bass problem by mounting a conventional cone bass driver in a separate section of the speaker chassis, generally resulting in a physically smaller speaker than the Magneplanar.

Magnepans have a life expectancy of about 20-30 years. Eventually the wires or aluminum strips start to delaminate from the mylar. Delamination will result in buzzing when playing low frequencies, and then get worse. This life expectancy shortens drastically when exposed to heat from a fireplace or heat duct, or UV radiation from being in direct sunlight. Magnepans can be shipped to the factory for repair. Repair can also be done at home.

== Technology ==
Magnepan has used several different technologies in constructing their magnetostatic speakers. All Magnepan speakers are based on flexible ferrite magnet strips (like refrigerator magnets), 0.060" (1.5 mm) thick, typically cut to either 1/4" (6 mm) wide (mid-bass) or 1/8" (3 mm) wide (tweeters) and more or less the length of the speaker. The magnets are glued to a piece of custom perforated 20-gauge (1 mm) steel sheet. The steel supports the magnets and also completes the magnetic circuit on the back of the magnets, resulting in about a 25% stronger magnetic field in front of the magnets. Mylar film, 0.0005" (12.5 μm) thick, is suspended in front of the magnet structure about 1/16" (1.6 mm) away from the magnets. Aluminum wires or film are then glued to the mylar. Only aluminum was used: copper has two-thirds the resistance of aluminum, which would make the speakers either much larger or much more difficult to drive. Very few amplifiers can handle 2.7-ohm speakers. Older Magnepans used aluminum magnet wire, thin 31 gauge (0.0089", 0.23 mm) for the tweeters and thicker 22 gauge (0.0253", 0.64 mm) for the mid-bass. The wire is glued to the mylar with 3M 77 spray adhesive, then sealed with 3M Fastbond 30NF (Magnepan used to use Milloxane to seal, but no more).

Newer Magnepans use 30 μm (0.0012") thick 1/8" (3 mm) wide aluminum tape instead of wire. When the aluminum tape is used instead of wires, Magnepan calls the speakers "Quasi-Ribbons". Using the aluminum tape spreads out the driving force on the mylar speaker diaphragm, resulting in noticeably lower distortion.

Magnepan ribbons are constructed with a strip of aluminum roughly 5 μm (0.0002") thick, 1/4" (6 mm) wide, 60" (1.5 m) long. The aluminum is corrugated – the pleats help keep the ribbon from flexing between the magnets. Before corrugating the ribbon it's more like 80" (2 m) long. The aluminum is suspended between two ferrite magnets, about 3/8 in × 1/2 in (9.5 mm × 12.7 mm) in cross-section. The magnets are attached to a 1/8" (3 mm) thick piece of formed and perforated steel, which both holds the magnets in place and also completes the magnetic circuit, resulting in about a 40% stronger magnetic field in the magnet gap.

The 20.7 and 30.7 speakers have magnet structures on both sides of the diaphragm, front and back. This push-pull design results in a more linear magnetic field and noticeably lower distortion in the midrange. It also results in much heavier speakers - about twice as heavy. All other models have magnets only at the back of the diaphragm.

The most frequently cited disadvantages of Magnepan's overall design are relatively low efficiency and, given the absence of an enclosure, difficulty in reproducing very low bass frequencies. Because of the low resistance (4 ohms) and low sensitivity (86 dB), it requires a surprising amount of current to drive the Magnepans to moderately loud listening levels. Many inexpensive receivers simply do not have the required current capacity, so they go into various distortion modes, including crossover distortion, current / SOA clipping and slew limiting, with the result that the Magnepans may not sound very good. If the amplifier starts clipping, it could destroy the ribbon or treble wiring. Driving the Magnepans with a 100-watt or better high-current amplifier will result in much better sound. Generally, the amplifier should put out double the power into 4 ohms that it does into 8 ohms; if the specification is for less than double, then the power supply and/or output stage of the amplifier will most likely not be sufficient to obtain best sound from the Magnepans. Many suitable modern and vintage amplifiers can do this, but it depends on their design.

== Models ==
Originally Magnepan sold the MG and the Tympani series. The Tympani series has been discontinued for several decades and is replaced by the 20.7 and 30.7 speakers.

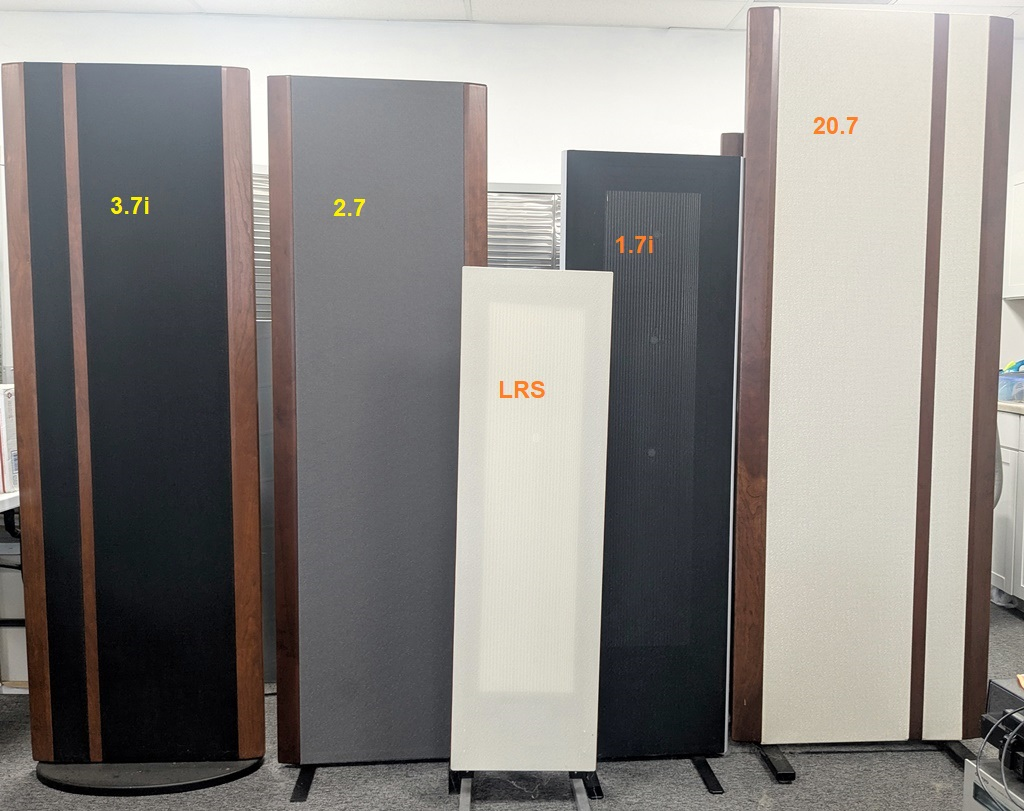
Magnepan LRS, 1.7i, 2.7, 3.7i, 20.7

The MG series has been produced continuously, but the "MG" has been dropped from the name; thus the MG-I is now the 1.7i, the MG-II is the 2.7i, and the MG-III is now the 3.7i. Magnepan also produced a small, relatively inexpensive speaker, the SMG, which became the MMG and is now called the LRS. The Tympanis and MG speakers were all made from wire-on-mylar; the speakers with no "MG" in the name are all made from aluminum foil on mylar ("Quasi-Ribbon"). The 2.6, 2.7i, MG-III, 3.7, Tympani IV, 20.7 and 30.7 all include Magnepan's ribbon driver and thus produce sound up to 40 kHz. The other speakers do not include a true ribbon and therefore produce sound only up to about 18–25 kHz.

Most of the Magnepans are now available with the "X" modification - better crossover components and a sturdier frame. The "X" option adds $2,000 to $11,000 to the price. So, for example, the 2.7i is $6000 and the 2.7X is $10,000.

All Magnepans are 4-ohm speakers, with sensitivity of 86 dB at 500 Hz, 2.83 V. The 4 ohms has almost zero phase throughout the audio band, so aside from requiring a lot of current these are easy speakers to drive.

Model	Technology	Freq. range	Size (inches)	Production years	Price 2025
Magneplanar LRS	2-Way / Quasi-Ribbon	50 Hz – 20 kHz	14.5 × 48 × 1.25	2019–2023	$600 used
Magneplanar LRS+	2-Way / Quasi-Ribbon	50 Hz – 20 kHz	14.5 × 48 × 1.25	2022–present	$1000
Magneplanar .7i / X	2-Way / Quasi-Ribbon	45 Hz – 20 kHz	15 × 54 × 1.25	2010–present	$2000 / $4000
Magneplanar 1.7i / X	3-Way / Quasi-Ribbon	40 Hz – 24 kHz	19 × 65 × 2	2010–present	$3000 / $5000
Magneplanar 2.6r	3-Way / Ribbon Tweeter + Quasi-Ribbon	40 Hz – 40 kHz	22 × 71 × 2	1994-1999	$1800 used
Magneplanar 2.7	3-Way / Quasi-Ribbon	40 Hz – 24 kHz	22 × 71 × 2	2000–2013	$2000 used
Magneplanar 2.7i / X	3-Way / Ribbon Tweeter + Quasi-Ribbon	40 Hz – 30 kHz	22 × 71 × 2	2024–present	$6,500 / $10,000
Magneplanar 3.7i / X	3-Way / Ribbon Tweeter + Quasi-Ribbon	35 Hz – 40 kHz	24 × 71 × 1.6	2013–present	$9,500 / $13,000
Magneplanar 20.7 / X	3-Way / Ribbon Tweeter + Quasi-Ribbon Push-pull magnet design	25 Hz – 40 kHz	29 × 79 × 2	2011–present	$23,000 / $30,000
Magneplanar 30.7 / X	4-Way / Ribbon Tweeter + Quasi-Ribbon Push-pull magnet design	20 Hz – 40 kHz	29 × 79 × 2 + 16 × 79 × 2	2017–present	$45,000 / $55,000
Magneplanar SMG / MMG	2-Way / Planar Magnetic	50 Hz – 18 kHz	14.5 × 48 × 1.6	1990–2018	$300 used
Magneplanar MG-I	2-Way / Planar Magnetic	50 Hz – 18 kHz	22 × 60 × 1.6	1972–1999	$300 used
Magneplanar MG-II	2-Way / Planar Magnetic	40 Hz – 18 kHz	22 × 71 × 1.6	1980–1999	$400 used
Magneplanar MG-III	3-Way / Ribbon Tweeter + Planar Magnetic	37 Hz – 40 kHz	23 × 72 × 2	1983–2000	$600 used
Magneplanar Tympani I	3-Way / Planar Magnetic	40 Hz – 20 kHz	48 × 72 × 1	1973–1978	$2000 used
Magneplanar Tympani III	3-Way / Planar Magnetic	35 Hz – 25 kHz	64 × 72 × 1	1976–1980	$2000 used
Magneplanar Tympani IV	3-Way / Ribbon Tweeter + Planar Magnetic	30 Hz – 40 kHz	48 × 72 × 1	1980–1999	$2500 used

== Interviews ==
- Jim Winey: Maggie's Man in Stereophile, January 2003
