= Audiophile =

High-fidelity sound reproduction enthusiast

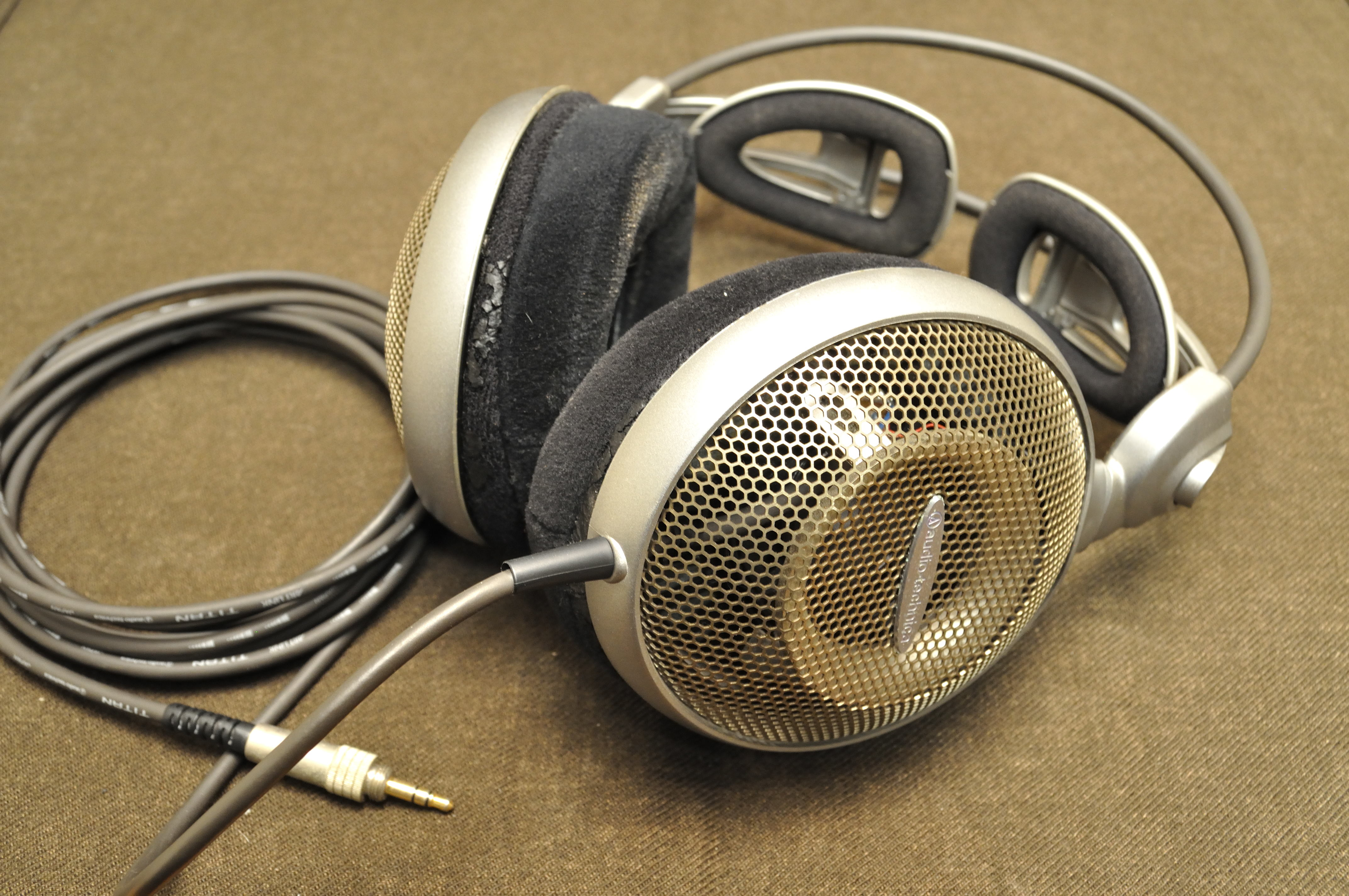
Over-ear headphones sold by Audio-Technica, an audiophile-oriented brand

An audiophile (from Latin: audīre, lit. 'to hear' + Greek: φίλος, romanized: philos, lit. 'loving') is a person who is enthusiastic about high-fidelity sound reproduction. An audiophile seeks to achieve high sound quality in the audio reproduction of recorded music, typically in a quiet listening space in a room with good acoustics.

Audiophile values may be applied at all stages of music reproduction—the initial audio recording, the production process, the storage of sound data, and the playback (usually in a home setting). In general, the values of an audiophile are in opposition to more convenient but lower-quality reproduction, especially lossy digital file types like MP3, lower-definition music streaming services, laptop or cell phone speakers, and low-cost headphones.

The term high-end audio refers to playback equipment used by audiophiles. High-end components include turntables, CD Players, digital-to-analog converters, equalization devices, preamplifiers and amplifiers (both solid-state and vacuum tube), loudspeakers (including horn, electrostatic and magnetostatic speakers), power conditioners, subwoofers, headphones, and acoustic room treatment.

Although many audiophile technologies are based on objective criteria that can be verified using techniques like ABX testing, perceived sound quality is necessarily subjective, often with subtle differences, leading to some audiophile techniques being based on pseudoscientific principles.

== Audio playback components ==
An audio system typically consists of one or more sources, an amplification system, and two or more loudspeakers.

Signal cables (analog audio, speaker, digital audio etc.) are used to link these components. There are also a variety of accessories, including equipment racks, power conditioners, devices to reduce or control vibration, record cleaners, anti-static devices, phonograph needle cleaners, reverberation reducing devices such as speaker pads and stands, sound absorbent foam, and soundproofing.

The interaction between the loudspeakers and the room (room acoustics) plays an important part in sound quality. Sound vibrations are reflected from walls, floor and ceiling, and are affected by the room's contents. Room dimensions can create standing waves at particular (usually low) frequencies. There are devices and materials for room treatment that affect sound quality. Soft materials, such as draperies and carpets, can absorb higher frequencies, whereas hard walls and floors can cause excess reverberation.

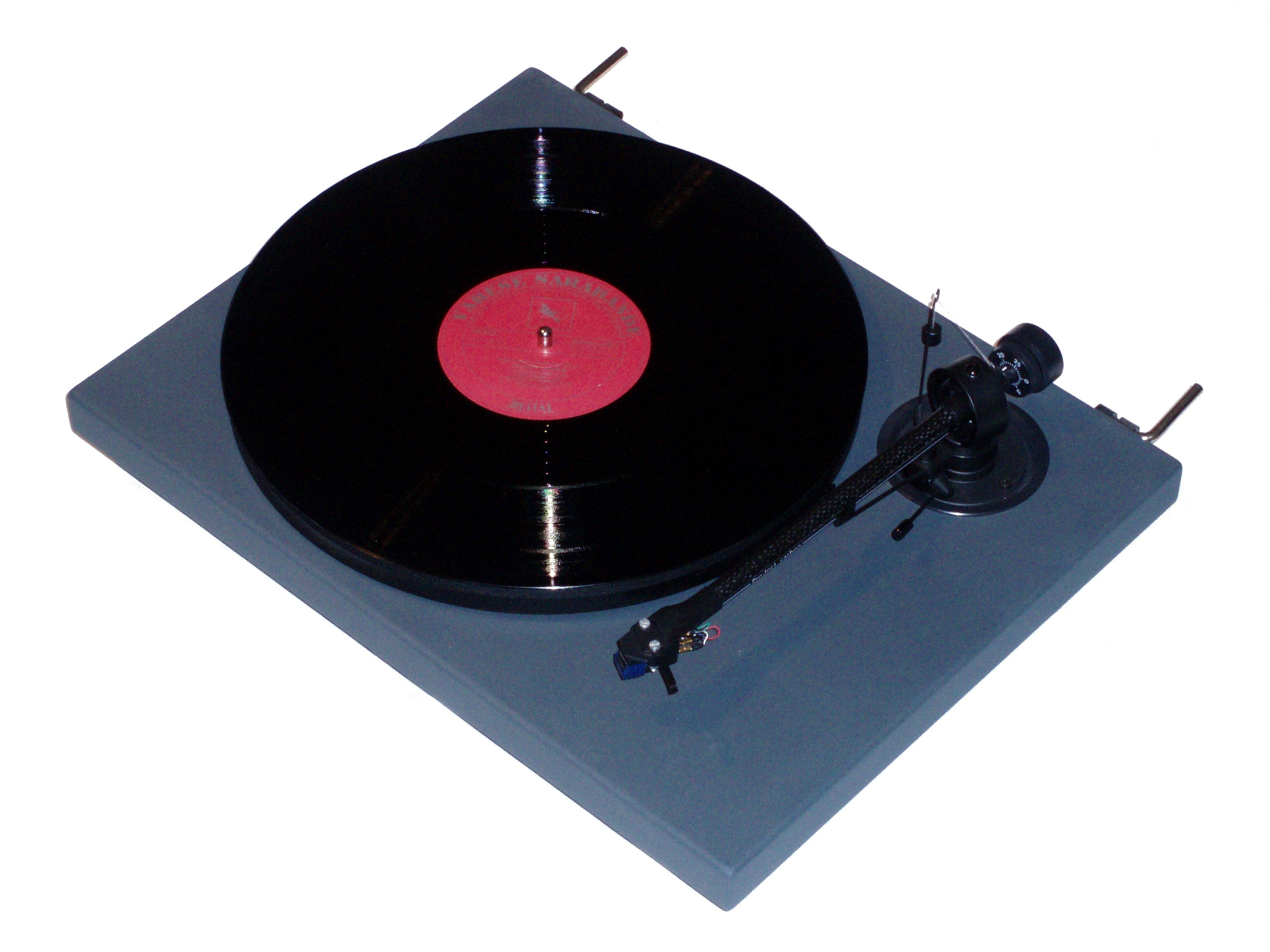
Modern turntable

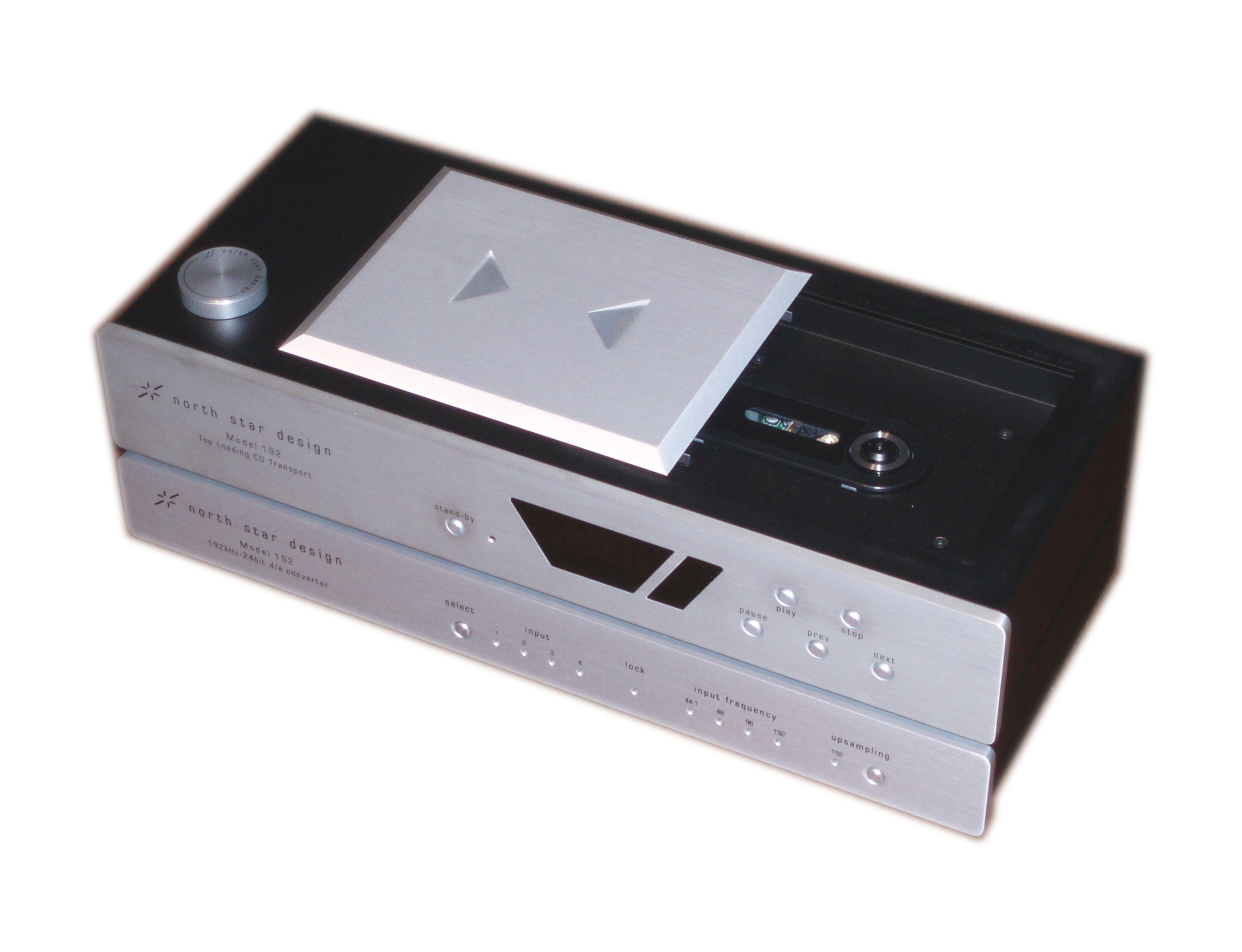
Top-loading CD player and external D-to-A converter

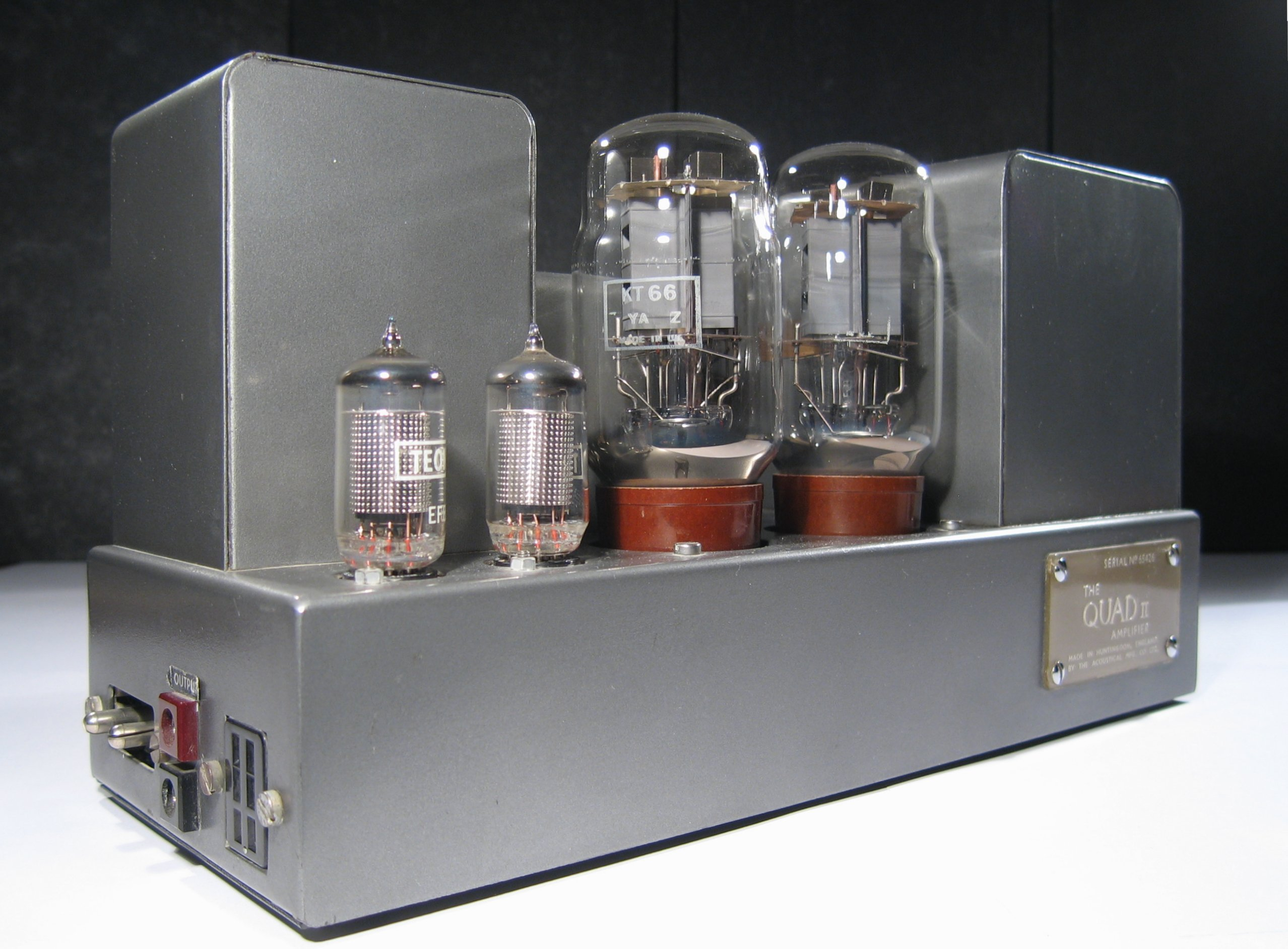
Quad II, an early monoblock valve (vacuum tube) amplifier

=== Sound sources ===
Audiophiles play music from a variety of sources including phonograph records, reel to reel tape, compact discs (CDs), and digital audio files. Digital files may be uncompressed, losslessly compressed (e.g. FLAC and Apple Lossless files), or use lossy compression (e.g. MP3 encoding). CDs were once the most common source of high-quality recordings. Turntables, tonearms, and magnetic cartridges are still used, despite the difficulties of keeping records free from dust and the delicate set-up associated with turntables.

The 44.1 kHz sampling rate of the CD format limits information to frequencies below the upper-frequency limit of human hearing – 20 kHz. Newer formats such as FLAC, ALAC, DVD-Audio and Super Audio Compact Disc (SACD) allow for higher sampling rates.

CD audio signals are encoded as 16-bit values for each sample. Higher-definition consumer formats such as HDCD-encoded CDs, DVD-Audio, and SA-CD contain 20-bit, 24-bit and 32-bit audio streams. With a greater number of bits per sample a greater dynamic range is possible; 20-bit dynamic range is theoretically 120 dB—the limit of most consumer electronic playback equipment.

SACDs and DVD-Audio have up to 5.1 to 6.1 surround sound. Although both of these high-resolution optical formats have failed to make an impact in the commercial market there has been a resurgence in high-resolution digital files. SACD can be stored as a DSD file, and DVD-Audio can be stored as an FLAC or ALAC file. FLAC is the most widely used digital format for high-resolution with up to 8 channels, a maximum depth of 32-bit, and 655,350 Hz sampling rate. Uncompressed formats such as WAV and AIFF files can store audio CD data without compression.

=== Amplifiers ===
A preamplifier selects among several audio inputs, amplifies source-level signals (such as those from a turntable), and allows the listener to adjust the sound with volume and tone controls. Many audiophile-oriented preamplifiers lack tone controls. A power amplifier takes the "line-level" audio signal from the preamplifier and drives the loudspeakers. An integrated amplifier combines the functions of power amplification with input switching and volume and tone control. Both pre/power combinations and integrated amplifiers are widely used by audiophiles.

Audiophile amplifiers are available based on solid-state (semiconductor) technology, vacuum-tube (valve) technology, or hybrid technology—semiconductors and vacuum tubes.

Dedicated amplifiers are also commonly used by audiophiles to drive headphones, especially those with high impedance and/or low sensitivity, or electrostatic headphones.

=== Loudspeakers ===
The loudspeaker's cabinet is known as the enclosure. There are a variety of loudspeaker enclosure designs, including sealed cabinets (acoustic suspension), ported cabinets (bass-reflex), transmission line, infinite baffles, and horn-loaded. The enclosure plays a major role in the sound of the loudspeaker.

Depending on the frequencies reproduced, the drivers that produce the sound are referred to as tweeters for high frequencies, midranges for middle frequencies, such as voice and lead instruments, and woofers for bass frequencies. Driver designs include dynamic, electrostatic, plasma, ribbon, planar, ionic, and servo-actuated. Drivers are made from various materials, including paper pulp, polypropylene, kevlar, aluminium, magnesium, beryllium, and vapour-deposited diamond.

The direction and intensity of the output of a loudspeaker, called dispersion or polar response, has a large effect on its sound. Various methods are employed to control the dispersion. These methods include monopolar, bipolar, dipolar, 360-degree, horn, waveguide, and line source. These terms refer to the configuration and arrangement of the various drivers in the enclosure.

The positioning of loudspeakers in the room strongly influences the sound experience. Loudspeaker output is influenced by interaction with room boundaries, particularly bass response, and high-frequency transducers are directional, or "beaming".

=== Headphones ===
Headphones can be remarkably expensive, some over $10,000, but in general are much cheaper than comparable speaker systems. They have the advantage of not requiring room treatment and being usable without requiring others to listen at the same time. However, many audiophiles still prefer speaker systems over headphones due to their ability to simulate an immersive, rounded sonic environment. Newer in ear monitors can be driven by the less powerful outputs found on portable music players.

=== Accessories ===
Audiophiles use a wide variety of accessories and fine-tuning techniques, sometimes referred to as "tweaks", to improve the sound of their systems. These include power conditioner filters to "clean" the electricity, equipment racks to isolate components from floor vibrations, specialty power and audio cables, loudspeaker stands (and footers to isolate speakers from stands), and room treatments.

There are several types of room treatment. Sound-absorbing materials may be placed strategically within a listening room to reduce the amplitude of early reflections, and to deal with resonance modes. Other treatments are designed to produce diffusion, reflection of sound in a scattered fashion. Room treatments can be expensive and difficult to optimize.

=== Digital vs. analog ===
There are differences of opinion about the relative merits of analog and digital sound. For music storage and playback, digital formats offer an absence of clicks, pops, wow, flutter, acoustic feedback, and rumble, compared to vinyl records. Digital can have a higher signal-to-noise ratio, a wider dynamic range, less total harmonic distortion, and a flatter and more extended frequency response. The digital recording and playback processes may include degradations not found in the analog processes, such as distortions associated with band limiting filter choices. Vinyl records remain popular; in addition to the intrinsic differences between analog and digital formats, vinyl records may be mastered differently from their digital versions, and multiple digital remasters may exist.

=== Vacuum tubes ===
Vacuum-tube electronics remain popular for power amplifiers, despite most other applications having since abandoned tubes for solid state devices. Vacuum-tube amplifiers often have higher total harmonic distortion, require rebiasing, are less reliable, generate more heat, are less powerful, and cost more. There is also continuing debate about the proper use of negative feedback in amplifier design.

== Equipment testing ==
There is disagreement among some audiophiles about the utility of equipment testing and how it should be conducted. Audiophile publications frequently describe differences in quality which are not detected by standard audio system measurements and double blind testing, claiming that they perceive differences in audio quality which cannot be measured by current instrumentation, and cannot be detected by listeners if listening conditions are controlled. Others say that the perceived differences can be explained by the placebo effect and confirmation bias.

Criticisms usually focus on claims around "tweaks" and accessories beyond the core components: the source, amplification, and speakers. Examples of these accessories include exotic cables (including speaker cables, analog and digital interconnects, and AC power cords), stones, cones, CD markers, and power conditioners. These products are often marketed using pseudoscientific claims about the skin effect, the dielectric introducing non-linear distortion, the need for cables to "break in", or the benefits of cryogenically freezing things. One of the most notorious "tweakers" was Peter Belt, who introduced numerous eccentric innovations that included a £500 "quantum clip" that consisted of a crocodile clip with a short length of copper wire attached.

Skeptic James Randi, through his foundation One Million Dollar Paranormal Challenge, offered a prize of $1 million to anyone able to demonstrate that $7,250 audio cables "are any better than ordinary audio cables". In 2008, audio reviewer Michael Fremer attempted to claim the prize, and said that Randi declined the challenge. Randi said that the cable manufacturer Pear Cables was the one who withdrew.

A study from 1988 found that although test subjects were able to distinguish between high fidelity, "expensive" cables versus common use cables, there was no statistically significant preference between the two cables. However, this experiment was not done as a double-blind test. In a 2024 blind experiment, audiophiles could not tell the difference between audio signals sent through pro audio copper wire or a banana.

== See also ==
- Golden ear
- Professional audio
- Videophile

Audiophile publications

- The Absolute Sound
- Audioholics
- Stereophile
- What Hi-Fi? Sound and Vision
