= Shelby Series 1 =

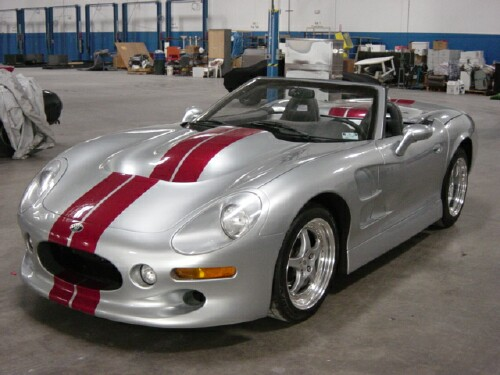

Overview
- Manufacturer: Shelby American
- Production: 1998–2005; 249 produced
- Model years: 1999
- Assembly: United States: Las Vegas Valley, Nevada

Body and chassis
- Class: Sports car (S)
- Body style: 2-door roadster
- Layout: Front engine, rear-wheel-drive

Powertrain
- Engine: 4.0 L L47 Aurora V8
- Transmission: 6-speed ZF manual

Dimensions
- Wheelbase: 96.0 in (2,438 mm)
- Length: 169.0 in (4,292 mm)
- Width: 76.5 in (1,943 mm)
- Height: 47.0 in (1,194 mm)
- Curb weight: 2,650 lb (1,202 kg)

Shelby Series 1 is a roadster designed by Carroll Shelby and produced by Shelby American. It was powered by Oldsmobile's 4.0-litre L47 Aurora V8 engine. Unveiled at the 1997 Los Angeles Auto Show, it was intended to be a modern day reinterpretation of the original Shelby AC Cobra. Despite initial claims that the car was entirely built in-house, much of the production run was overseen by General Motors, with many of the components used from their parts bin, including the powerplant.

== Development ==
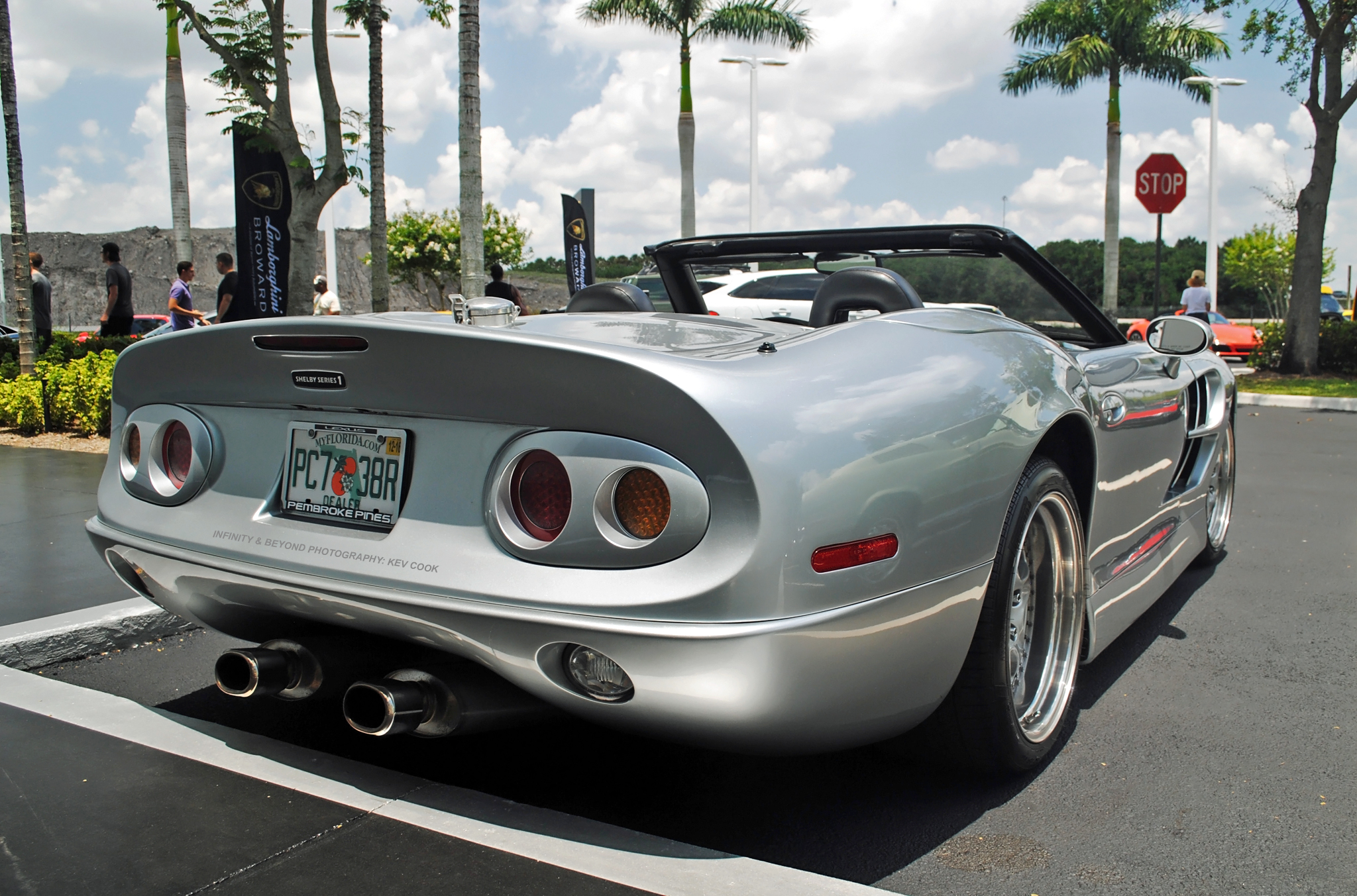
Shelby Series 1 rear

Prior to production of the Series 1, significant costs were incurred in testing and certification required to conform to 1999 Federal Motor Vehicle Safety Standards. In early 2000, Shelby announced a retroactive price increase but were forced to backtrack within a few weeks. Another developmental issue was the car's soft top; these were not attaching properly and required reengineering after the first sixty-plus cars had already been built. Thirty cars had been delivered without convertible tops and technicians were sent to install them at buyers' homes. A production run of 500 cars had been announced, but in total 249 of the Series 1 were constructed by Shelby American, all as 1999 models.

During production, Venture Corporation purchased Shelby American. The purchase included the rights to the Series 1 model, but not the rights to produce the "Continuation Series" Shelby Cobras. In 2004, after a subsequent bankruptcy by Venture Corporation, Carroll Shelby's new company Shelby Automobiles, Inc. purchased the Series 1 assets for pennies on the dollar. Included in the asset purchase were sufficient components to produce several more complete Series 1s.

Because the 1999 Federal Motor Vehicle Safety Standards certificate had expired, and the cost to re-certify the car was prohibitive, all Series 1's produced after that date were completed as "component cars" and delivered with no engine or transmission. Those "component car" models built in 2005 are identified with a seven digit vehicle identification number (VIN) and were designated with a CSX5000 series serial number. The original 249 were production cars with a seventeen digit VIN.

A lot of the interior components came from General Motors, such as a Monsoon premium sound system, an A/M-F/M cassette player and CD player radio from Buick, an instrument cluster and climate controls from Pontiac, and a few other parts.

== Technical specifications ==
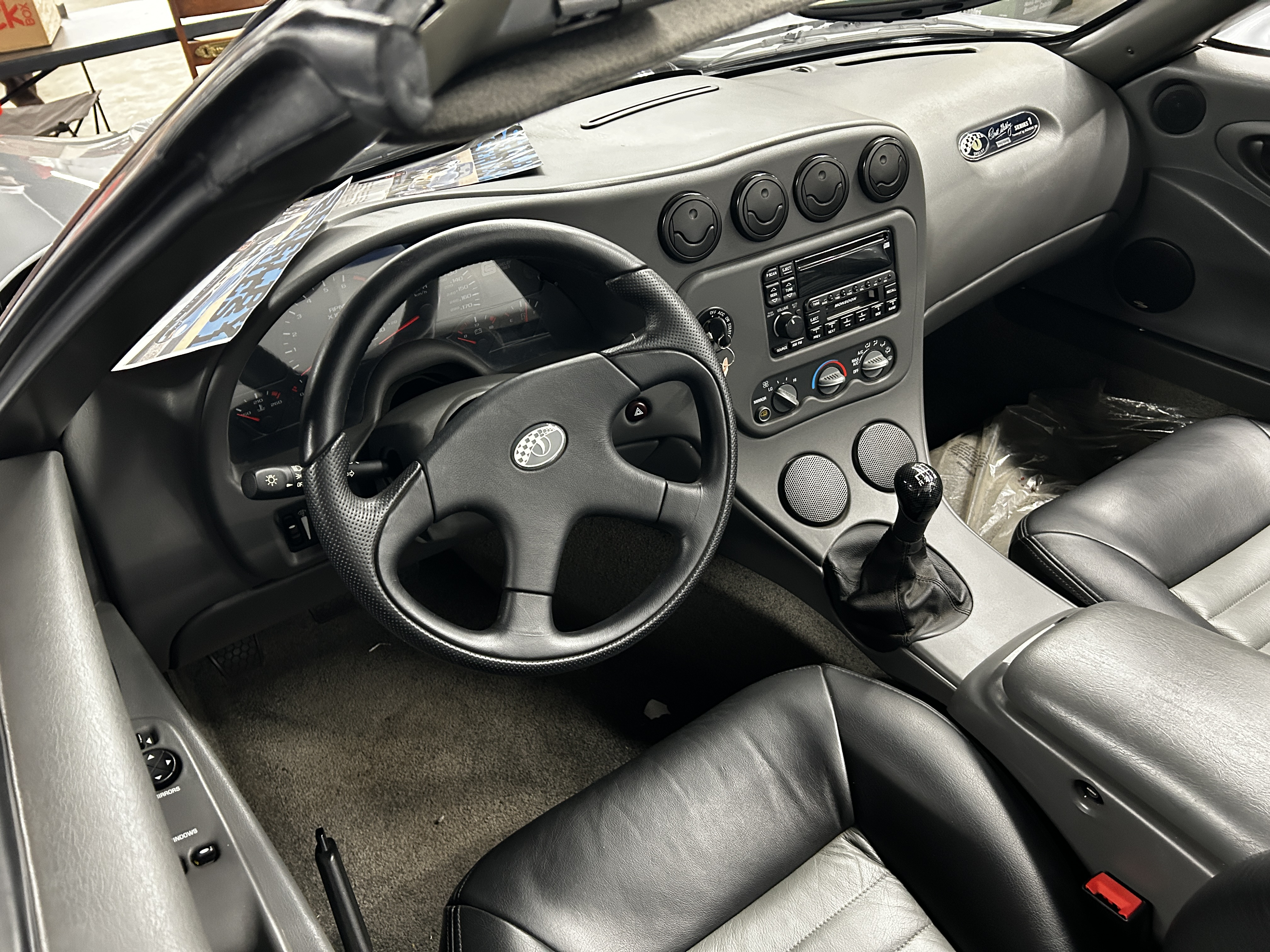
The interior of a Series 1

The Series 1 is powered by a 4.0 L (3,995 cc; 243.8 cu in) DOHC V8 engine from Oldsmobile’s Aurora line, upgraded by Shelby to produce approximately 320 hp (239 kW; 324 PS) at 6,500 rpm and 290 lb⋅ft (393 N⋅m) of torque at 5,000 rpm in its standard naturally aspirated configuration. Two upgrade options were available from Shelby American: the X50 performance package and a supercharged variant. The first option, called X50 cost US$20,150. It was supposed to add an additional 50 hp (37 kW; 51 PS) to the engine's power output. The second option included the addition of a supercharger costing US$35,100 which increased the power output up to 450 hp (456 PS; 336 kW). Shelby American Records show only 11 cars were built with both X50 and the supercharged options. Although the X50 package came up short of its advertised gains, both options worked well together pushing the power output to just over 540 hp (547 PS; 403 kW). The X50 optioned cars required a US$4,160 2 piston brake package upgrade. While factory supercharged cars were additionally required to add an US$11,050 4 piston brake package upgrade and were additionally fitted with a special dual disc clutch system.

The Series 1 came with features such as power steering, power disc brakes, factory air conditioning, power windows, and an AM/FM/CD audio system. The convertible top folded away into a compartment located behind the cabin. Some cars were sold as a true open tops with no convertible tops.

The Series 1 has dual wishbone suspension with coil-over remote reservoir dampers mounted inboard, and actuated by rocker arms. The engine was mounted completely behind the front axle, helping give the car a 50/50 weight distribution, and drove a drive shaft supported in a torque tube that spun a 6 speed ZF trans-axle specially modified for the Series 1. The chassis was made of extruded and formed 6061 aluminum. It was welded together and then post-heat-treated for maximum strength throughout. Then aluminum honeycomb panels specially designed were bonded into the floor boards and rocker panels for added structure and stiffness. The body panels were carbon fiber and fiberglass laminate. The engine, torque-tube, trans-axle, and damper mounts were all rubber-isolated from the frame. The supercharged prototypes had an engine power output of 600 hp (608 PS; 447 kW) and 530 lb⋅ft (720 N⋅m) of torque. The Goodyear Eagle F1 tires specially made for the car, were based on an IMSA racing rain tires that had been used for the show car.

In a Motor Trend road test, the naturally aspirated version recorded a 0-60 mph (0–97 km/h) acceleration time of 4.4 seconds and a quarter mile time of 12.8 seconds at 109.9 mph (176.9 km/h). With a curb weight of approximately 1,202 kg (2,650 lb) and lightweight construction using aluminum and carbon fiber, the Series 1 was capable of reaching a top speed of around 170 mph (274 km/h). In a Car and Driver road test, a supercharged Series 1 recorded a 0-60 mph (0–97 km/h) acceleration time of 4.1 seconds and a quarter mile time of 13.0 seconds at 112 mph (180.2 km/h), which the testers say was limited by clutch problems which subsequently disabled the car.

== Other specifications ==
- Wheels front: 18"x10"
- Wheels rear: 18"x12"
- Tires front: 265/40 ZR-18
- Tires rear: 315/40 ZR-18

== Series II ==
After the bankruptcy of Venture Corporation, new investors approached Carroll Shelby with plans to build a Series II (a.k.a.: "Series 2"). The design was much like the Series I, but with restyled bumpers, headlamp assemblies, improved powertrain, more horsepower and other refinements. Three prototype Series II’s were built for introduction at the 2006 Concorso Italiano in Monterey, CA. They were introduced at a price of $225,000 for the production models. Orders with deposits were placed for a limited production run. All but a few production slots sold out in a relatively short time.

After the prototypes were completed and before production began, more restrictive US DOT emission and safety standards became law, pushing the cost of Series II homologation well beyond what was originally anticipated. With the significant changes and additional testing required to meet new standards, the project ran out of money and was put on hold. Over $5,000,000 US was invested into the Series 2 project, but only the three Series II prototypes were built.

The Series II project was relaunched in 2024, ahead of the 25th anniversary of the Series 1. Only 10 cars are set to be produced, with a choice of three engine options; a 7.0-litre 427 Windsor V8, a 7.3-litre ‘Godzilla’ V8 Ford Performance crate engine, or an all-electric powertrain. Unlike the previous Series II concept, this version features a hardtop roof. Prices begin at £305,000.

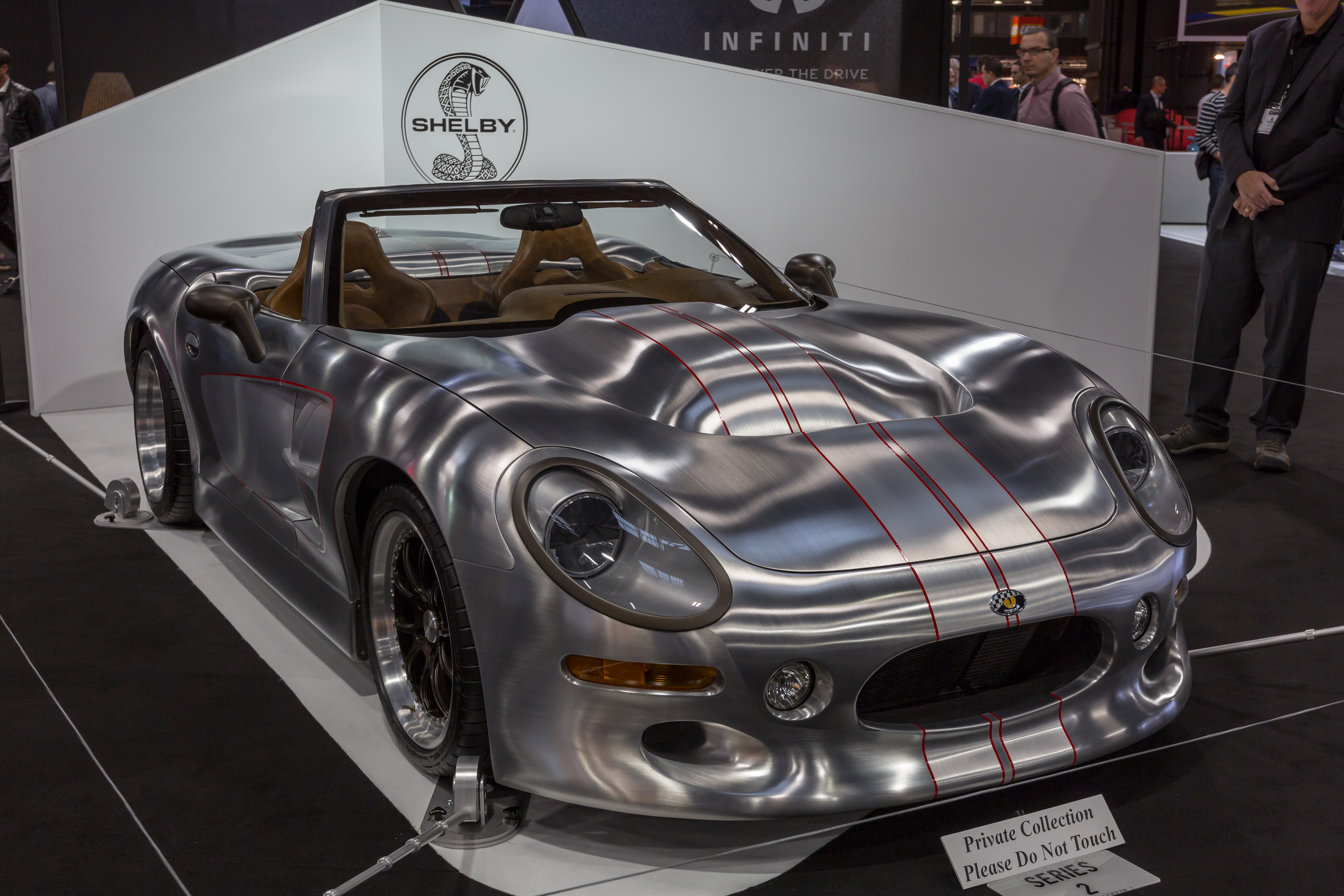
Series 2 with a brushed aluminium body

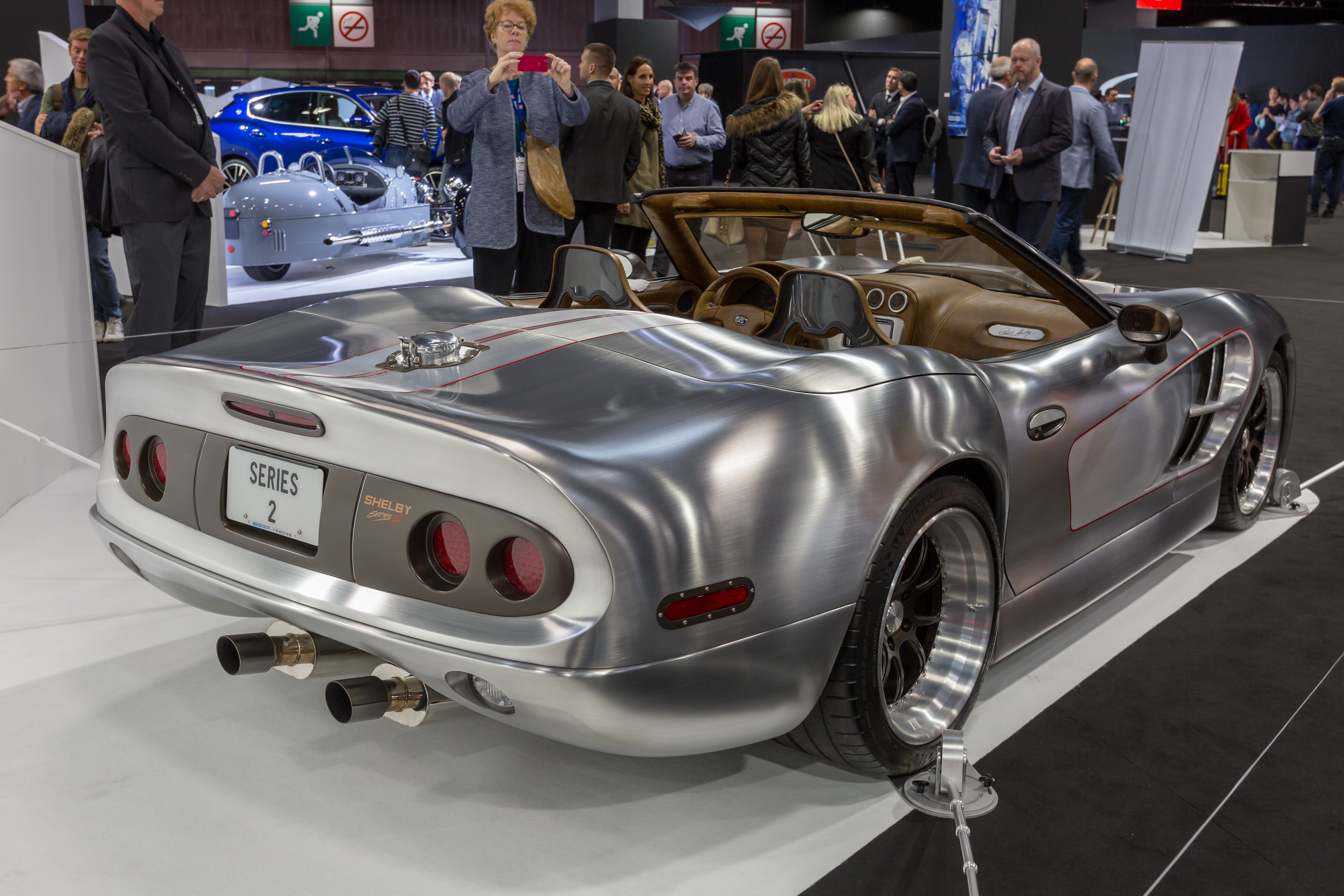
Rear view of Series 2
