= Eminent Technology =

American audio electronics company

- Type: Private
- Industry: Audio electronics
- Founded: 1983; 43 years ago
- Founder: Bruce Thigpen
- Headquarters: Florida, United States
- Key people: Bruce Thigpen
- Products: Home audio, audio equipment
- Website: www.eminent-tech.com

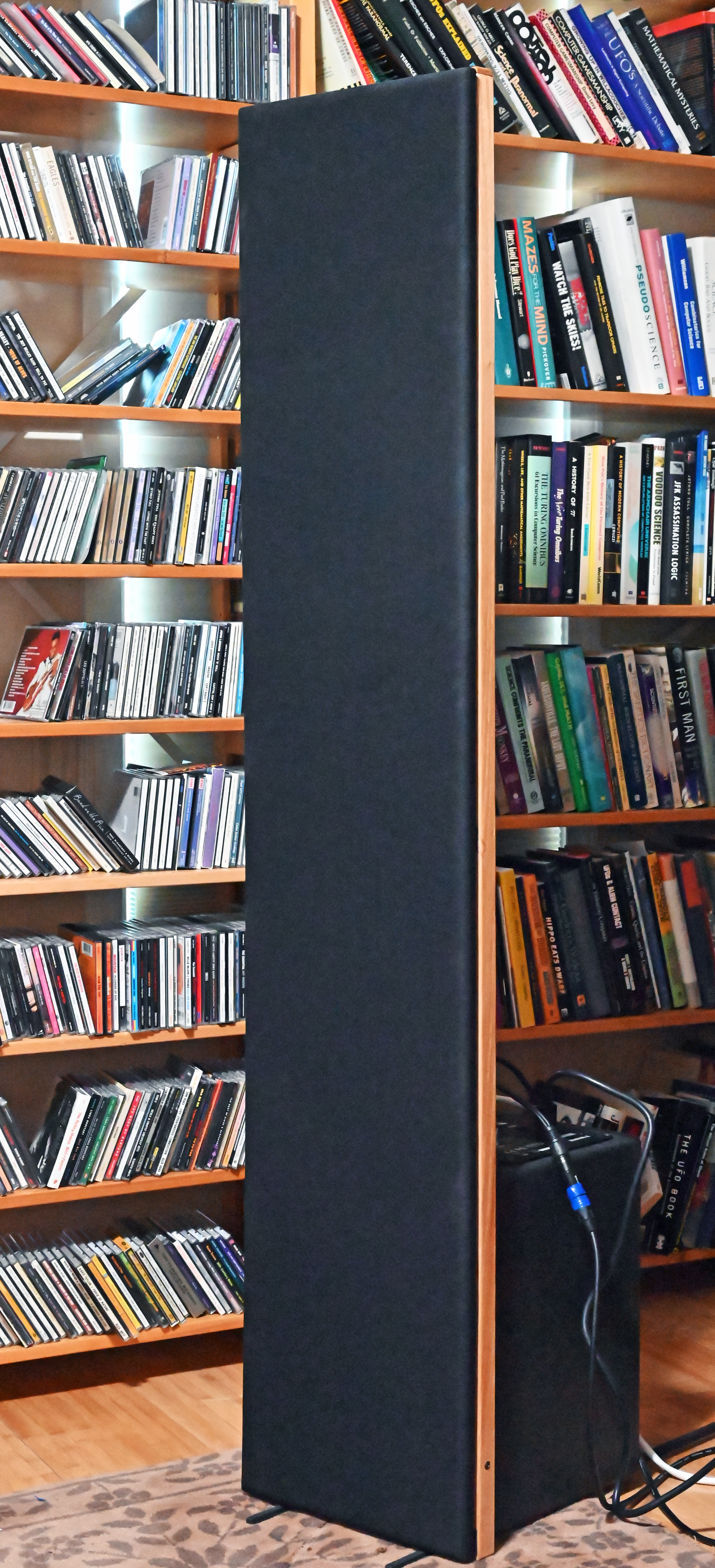
LFT-8c planar magnetic speaker

Eminent Technology is an American audio electronics company based in Florida, established in 1983 by Bruce Thigpen. The company manufactures tonearms and speakers mostly at its own facility in Tallahassee, Florida.

== History ==
Their first product was an air bearing straight-line tracking tonearm for phonograph playback, and was the first implementation of a captured air bearing for tonearm use. It was followed by a more advanced version of the tonearm.

In 1985 the company began developing planar magnetic loudspeakers and in 1987 introduced the world's first full-range push-pull (with electromagnets on both sides of the membrane) planar magnetic loudspeaker, the LFT-3. Another of the company's products is the Thigpen Rotary Woofer. Typical subwoofer products are inefficient at producing desired sound pressure levels at frequencies below 20 Hz, but the TRW is designed to cover the range down to 1 Hz of the sound spectrum. (The technical principle would allow even zero Hz.)

In the 1990s Eminent Technology developed a smaller planar transducer for automotive applications. This was adapted for computer speakers as the LFT-11, a multimedia speaker system, The company licensed the technology to Sonigistix and it appeared in Monsoon and other brands.
