= Rotary woofer =

Type of loudspeaker capable of producing very low frequency sound

A rotary woofer is a subwoofer-style loudspeaker which reproduces very-low-frequency content by using a conventional speaker voice coil's motion to change the pitch (angle) of the blades of an impeller rotating at a constant speed. The pitch of the fan blades is controlled by the audio signal presented to the voice coil, and is able to swing both positive and negative, with respect to a zero-pitch blade position. Since the audio amplifier only changes the pitch of the blades, it takes much less power for a given sound level to drive a rotary woofer than a conventional subwoofer, which uses a moving electromagnet (voice coil) placed within the field of a stationary permanent magnet to move a diaphragm to displace air. Rotary woofers excel at producing sounds below 20 Hz, below the normal hearing range; when installed in a wall of a sealed room, they can produce arbitrarily low frequencies, down to a static pressure differential, by simply compressing or decompressing the air in the sealed room.

== Description ==
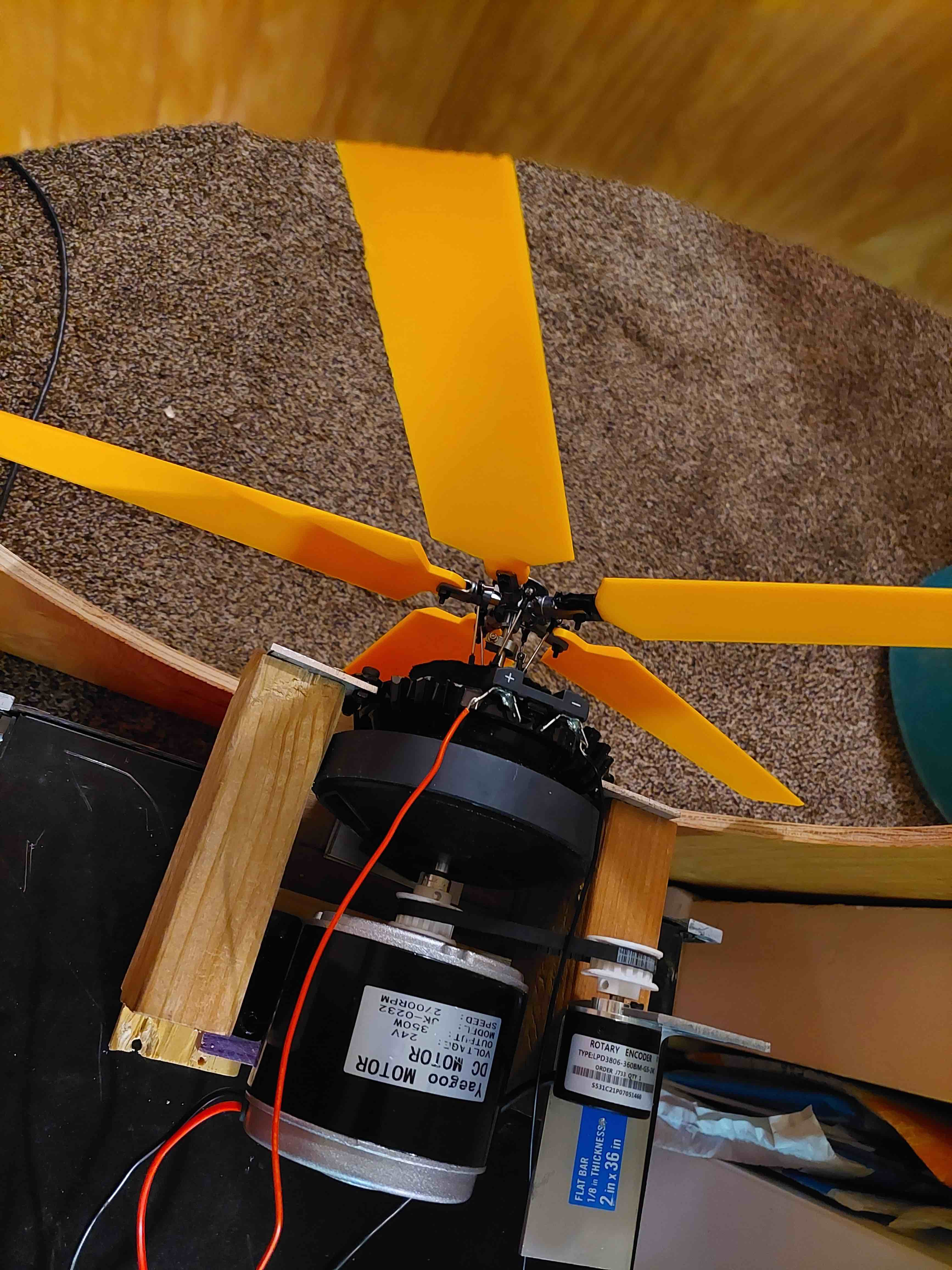
A homemade rotary subwoofer with 3D-printed fan blades attached to a remote-control helicopter swashplate

The rotary subwoofer design was first patented on December 1, 1942, by R.C. Sanders, Jr., under U.S. Patent Number 2,304,022. In the early 1970s, researchers noted that while humans could detect frequencies below 20 Hz, the ear was much less sensitive to these frequencies. As a result, increased sound pressure levels are required to perceive these sounds. These frequencies are often not audible but still subliminally detected by humans (see: Infrasound). Typical subwoofers using moving cones do not transmit energy very well to the air below 20 Hz, and thus their sound pressure level (SPL) falls off significantly below this frequency.

To help people to perceive the very-low-frequency content available in recorded material, Bruce Thigpen of Eminent Technology experimented with new methods of producing the required SPL. The rotary woofer displaces far more air than is possible using moving cones, which makes very-low-frequency reproduction possible.

Instead of using a moving electromagnet (voice coil) placed within the field of a stationary permanent magnet to drive a cone, like a conventional subwoofer, on a rotary woofer, the voice coil's motion is used to change the angle of a fixed-rotation-speed set of fan blades in order to generate sound pressure waves. The pitch of the blades changes according to the signal the amplifier supplies, producing a modulated sound wave due to the air moved by the spinning blades. If there is no signal applied, the blades simply rotate "flat" at zero pitch, producing no sound. Since the audio amplifier only changes the pitch of the blades, it takes much less power to drive a rotary woofer, although a secondary power source is required to drive the fan motor.

As an analogy, the hub of the rotary woofer's fan is somewhat like a helicopter's swashplate which allows a stationary source of reciprocating motion—the voice coil of the subwoofer—to change the angle of the spinning set of blades. Many DIY rotary woofers use swashplates of remote-control helicopters connected to modified conventional subwoofer drivers acting as linear actuators in order to modulate the pitch of the blades.

== Drawbacks ==
A rotary woofer is designed to produce only frequencies lower than 20 Hz; distortion increases as the input frequency approaches the frequency of blades passing a given point. Fan speed is limited to reduce the continuous noise generated by the fan blades. Current models typically spin at around 800 RPM (13 Hz). Another issue with rotary woofers is the space requirement. Where a conventional subwoofer needs a baffle or enclosure to prevent back waves from destructively interfering with the output, a rotary woofer also requires a baffle or enclosure. However, because the frequencies are so low, the enclosure or baffle must be very large in comparison. Without a baffle or enclosure, sound pressure from the rear of the unit being 180 degrees out of phase would almost completely cancel that from the front end, resulting in very low output. An infinite baffle can be created by mounting the woofer and circular cutout into a window. Alternatively an attic, basement, or spare room can act as the enclosure.

== Installations ==
Six rotary woofers were installed as part of an immersive Niagara Falls attraction known as Niagara's Fury, located in the Table Rock House, to provide low-frequency extension down to below 1 hertz, to emulate the waves created by the falls. However, the rotary woofers were removed some time before September 2023.

== See also ==
- Eminent Technology
- Civil defense siren

== Sources ==
- Danish study on Infrasound (in Danish)
- Journal of Acoustic Society paper by Yeowart and Evans
- UK government paper on very low frequency sound
