= MartinLogan =

American loudspeaker manufacturer

- Company type: Corporation
- Industry: Consumer electronics
- Founded: 1979; 47 years ago in Lawrence, Kansas, U.S.
- Founders: Gayle Martin Sanders; Ron Logan Sutherland
- Headquarters: Lawrence, Kansas
- Key people: Scott Bagby (CEO, Chairman)
- Products: Electrostatic speakers, subwoofers, home theater systems
- Number of employees: 70+
- Parent: ShoreView Industries (2005–2019); Bagby Family (2019–present)
- Website: www.martinlogan.com

MartinLogan (ML) is a Canadian/US company producing conventional subwoofer speakers as well as floor-standing, wall-mounted, and in-wall hybrid speakers using electrostatic loudspeaker and planar magnetic thin film loudspeaker technology.

== Origins ==
MartinLogan was founded by Gayle Martin Sanders and Ron Logan Sutherland, who met in the late 1970s at a high-end audio store Sanders managed in Lawrence, Kansas. Despite different backgrounds (Sanders had trained in architecture and advertising, Sutherland in electrical engineering) they shared a passion for music and electrostatic loudspeakers.

Discussion of electrostatic speakers and the available technology led Sanders and Sutherland to design and build an electrostatic speaker. Sanders organized a research and development team to transform a design he had tinkered with for more than a decade into a marketable electrostatic transducer.

== The first prototype ==
The first prototype was ready in 1980. The sound quality was adequate, but at high volume levels there was arcing within the electrostatic panels.

The team began experiments with aerospace materials that led to improved performance. The drivers were made with conductive coatings, insulation, and adhesives, and an ultra-light Mylar diaphragm between two perforated-steel stators.

Satisfied with the aesthetics, Sanders still struggled with achieving satisfactory high-frequency dispersion without compromising sound quality (physically wide transducers radiate high frequencies in a narrow beam rather than fanning them over a wide area.) The solution came in a midnight session, when Sutherland sketched a theoretical sound wave to illustrate how sound disperses. Sanders envisioned a horizontally curved panel, the curvilinear line-source (or CLS), transducer central to the design of every MartinLogan electrostat since.

With only a mock-up and some photographs, Sanders and Sutherland exhibited their speaker concept at the 1982 Consumer Electronics Show (CES) in Chicago. The design was honored with a CES Design and Engineering Award. Excited by the response, they headed home to Kansas to translate their ideas into a working—and saleable—model.

Through a network of high-technology manufacturers, Sanders and Sutherland enlisted the help of other engineers with expertise and interest in the project. The company that fabricated the space shuttle's filtered windows and the people who had created Teflon-coated cookware joined the design team. The final driver panel was patented and used a vapor deposition process, an optically transparent diaphragm that could support a 5,000-volt charge, and a conformal coating that uniformly insulated each perforated stator to a charge of up to 10,000 volts.

== Products ==
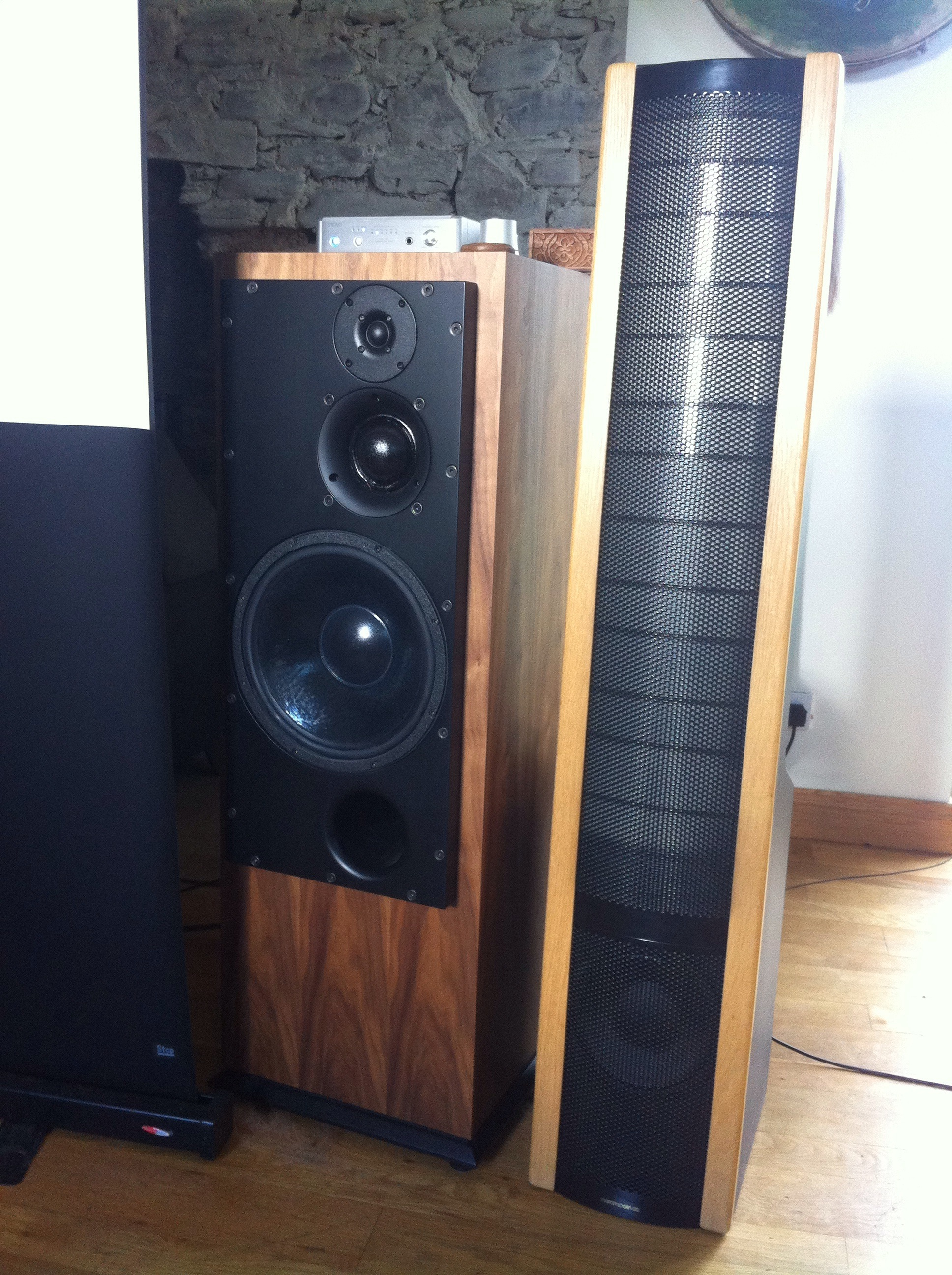
A MartinLogan tower speaker (right) with signature large, curved electrostatic driver.

=== Monolith ===
By the time of the 1983 Consumer Electronics Show (CES), they had developed a full-range hybrid electrostatic loudspeaker they called the Monolith. A high-end audio company used a prototype pair in its room at the show to demonstrate its electronics. Dealers who heard them were impressed by the sound of the Monoliths and were eager to sell them. It was at this point that Sanders and Sutherland put their middle names to the venture and set about satisfying the demand they had created. MartinLogan was created.

Working with one full-time and one part-time employee, they built and shipped the first 10 pairs of Monoliths. Sales started to surge in 1985, and the company was finally on a firm footing. Sutherland departed to return to his first love, electronics. The next year, MartinLogan moved to its current location. At the same time, international distribution for the Monolith took off.

Steady growth followed. By 1988, sales had increased tenfold, and the plant had expanded to include a large production space. In 1989, and again in 1990, Inc. magazine recognized MartinLogan as one of the 500 fastest-growing privately held companies in the United States.

In the early 1990s, MartinLogan released the world's first electrostatic home cinema center-channel speaker and on-wall surround channel speakers, establishing the brand in the emerging home theater market. During this time, some of MartinLogan's most popular electrostatic speakers were introduced, including the Aerius, SL3, Quest, and Cinema.

=== The Statement e2 generation ===
MartinLogan's next product began to take form in 1997 in the form of the 2000-pound Statement e2 loudspeaker. The design and engineering behind the Statement e2 fueled the next generation of MartinLogan electrostatic speakers (not to mention ML's first non-electrostatic product). Released in 1999, the Prodigy electrostatic loudspeaker incorporated much of the design and engineering knowledge gained during the Statement e2 project. Prodigy in turn inspired a new generation of electrostatic products including the Odyssey, Ascent, Aeon and Theater.

=== Subwoofers ===
The next product was MartinLogan's first non-electrostatic product. In 2001 the original Descent subwoofer (featuring servo-control and BalancedForce technologies) established MartinLogan as a major player in the growing subwoofer market. Other subwoofer models by MartinLogan include the Descent i, Depth i, Grotto, Abyss and Dynamo.

=== The Design Series ===
In 2003 the MartinLogan Design Series was launched aimed at producing a smaller, more affordable line of speakers. Speakers in the Design Series include the Clarity, Mosaic, Montage, Fresco, Vignette, as well as the Abyss and Dynamo subwoofers.

=== In-wall speakers ===
Now established as a loudspeaker 'technology' company (not just an 'electrostatic' company) MartinLogan designed a first for high-performance speakers — inside a wall - the Voyage and Passage in-wall loudspeakers (released 2004).

=== The ESL Series ===
In January 2005 MartinLogan released the Summit electrostat. A major departure from previous electrostatics, Summit combined dual independently powered woofers with MartinLogan's most advanced electrostatic transducer to date—the XStat. Later additions to the ESL Series include the Vista, Vantage, and Stage loudspeakers as well as the Descent i and Depth i subwoofers.

== Current ==
In October 2005, ML was acquired by a subsidiary of ShoreView Industries. ShoreView is a financial firm that makes investments in companies. ShoreView is a passive investor that is not from the loudspeaker or audio business and is not involved in day-to-day operations. Production of MartinLogan Electrostatic loudspeakers was moved to the Paradigm manufacturing facility in Mississauga, Ontario, Canada post this acquisition. Conventional loudspeakers by MartinLogan, the Motion line, are manufactured in China.

On May 13, 2019, Paradigm Electronics in Mississauga, Ontario, issued a press release that stated "Scott Bagby and John Bagby announced the purchase of Paradigm Electronics, Anthem Electronics, and MartinLogan Loudspeakers, effective May 10, 2019."

Scott Bagby, one of the original founders of Paradigm Electronics, will continue as chairman and will assume the role of CEO. John Bagby, who has always been active in Paradigm daily business, takes on the role of managing director.

== See also ==
- Audiophile
- High-end audio
- High fidelity
- Loudspeaker
