= Peter Belt =

British inventor

- Born: 1930
- Died: February 17, 2017 (aged 86–87)
- Occupation: Businessman

Peter W. Belt (1930 – 17 February 2017) was a British manufacturer of unusual "treatments" to be applied to hi-fi equipment by audiophile enthusiasts. His products, sold through his company PWB Electronics, included the £500 "quantum clip" that consisted of a crocodile clip with a short length of wire attached, and £15 "morphic link paper clips", which were paper clips that Belt stated had been "treated" to give them special properties. Belt claimed that the principles of some of his products derived from morphic resonance, a paranormal concept hypothesized by Rupert Sheldrake.

Belt and his "treatments" made common appearances in hi-fi magazines, with opinions varying from the skeptical to the laudatory. Some of Belt's other ideas included freezing compact discs before playing, and using only white cables.
