= Golden ear =

Person with an above-standard sense of hearing

A golden ear is a term used in professional audio circles to refer to a person who is thought to possess special talents in hearing. People described as having golden ears are said to be able to discern subtle differences in audio reproduction that most inexperienced and untrained listeners cannot.

A tin ear is an antonym to this talent, someone who is tone-deaf and cannot distinguish what they hear well at all.

Another meaning of the term is used by audiologists to describe aging test subjects who do not demonstrate the expected age-related loss in hearing acuity.

== Music perception ==
A person said to have golden ears is one who can perceive more subtle changes in sound than others, either by training or by birth. The skill is rare.

An ongoing blind loudspeaker listening program developed by Floyd E. Toole of Harman International has demonstrated that listeners can be trained to reliably discern relatively small frequency response differences among loudspeakers, whereas untrained listeners cannot. He showed that inexperienced listeners cannot reliably identify even large frequency response deviations.

Toole's research also indicates that when participants can see what they are hearing, their preferences often change profoundly. If the listener and test administrator don't know which sound source is the favored-to-win candidate, the differences often disappear (or the favorite loses).

Skilled listeners who claim to be able to hear differences among various pieces of audio gear assert that the ability to do so is no different from discerning picture quality differences among cameras, or discerning image quality differences among video display devices. However others argue that there are fundamental differences in the way audio and visual reproductions such as a photograph are compared, photographs can be compared side by side and simultaneously whereas audio must be compared sequentially.

The minimum audible change in sound pressure level is generally thought to be around 1 dB, but less than 0.1 dB has been reported in blind listening tests. When testing, the level difference between stimuli is therefore recommended to be calibrated to ±0.05 dB.

In the context of high-end audio, the term golden ears is frequently used in a sarcastic manner to refer to people who subscribe to pseudoscientific, magical or paranormal principles around audio equipment.

== Age and hearing ==
The term golden ears has also been used by audiologists to describe mature adult test subjects who show a hearing acuity similar to that of youthful subjects. In this group, the normal, expected age-related decline in hearing acuity is not observed.

== See also ==
- The Man with the Golden Ear Award
