= Magnetostatic loudspeaker =

Sound production device

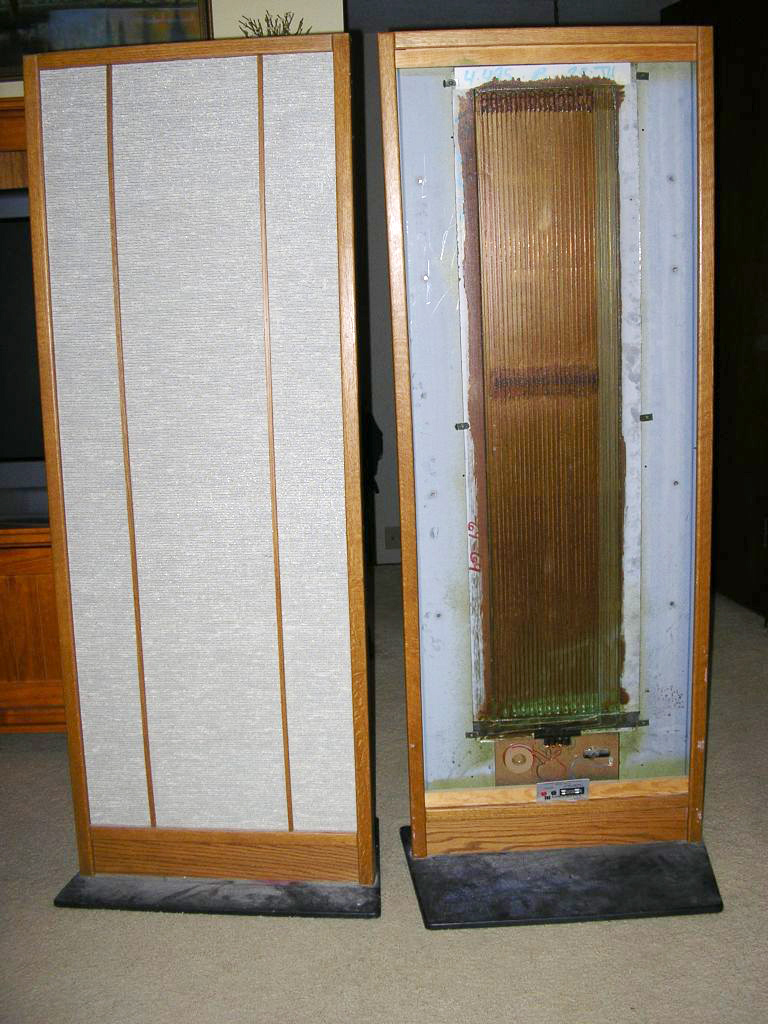
Magnetostatic loudspeaker

A magnetostatic loudspeaker is a dipole loudspeaker that is similar to an electrostatic loudspeaker but uses high currents instead of using high voltages. Permanent magnets provide a static magnetic field and wires or strips carrying audio frequency currents are bonded to a thin diaphragm. The current flowing in the conductors interacts with the magnetic field and creates sound in much the same way as in a conventional dynamic driver. Because of its dipole structure, this kind of speaker creates sound mostly to its front and back.

The impedance of a magnetostatic speaker is often mainly resistive, but in some cases may be so low that the amplifiers have to be ready to accommodate the low impedance load. Magnetostatic speakers provide good sound quality, and may be very thin, but for producing also lower frequencies with good enough sensitivity, their height and width dimensions must be rather large.

Magnepan is the main producer of magnetostatic loudspeakers for high fidelity home audio.
