= Electrostatic loudspeaker =

Sound playback device

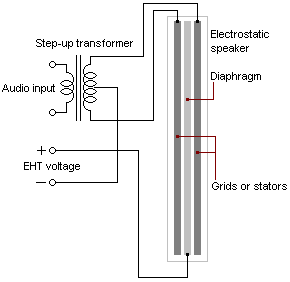
Schematic showing an electrostatic speaker's construction and its connections. The thickness of the diaphragm and grids has been exaggerated for the purpose of illustration.

An electrostatic loudspeaker (ESL) is a loudspeaker design in which sound is generated by the force exerted on a membrane suspended in an electrostatic field.

== Design and functionality ==
The speakers use a thin flat diaphragm usually consisting of a plastic sheet coated with a conductive material such as graphite sandwiched between two electrically conductive grids, with a small air gap between the diaphragm and grids. For low distortion operation, the diaphragm must operate with a constant charge on its surface, rather than with a constant voltage. This is accomplished by either or both of two techniques: the diaphragm's conductive coating is chosen and applied in a manner to give it a very high surface resistivity, and/or a large value resistor is placed in series between the EHT (Extra High Tension or Voltage) power supply and the diaphragm (resistor not shown in the diagram here). However, the latter technique will still allow distortion as the charge will migrate across the diaphragm to the point closest to the "grid" or electrode thereby increasing the force moving the diaphragm; this will occur at audio frequency so the diaphragm requires a high resistance (megohms) to slow the movement of charge for a practical speaker.

The diaphragm is usually made from a polyester film (thickness 2–20 μm) with exceptional mechanical properties, such as PET film. By means of the conductive coating and an external high voltage supply the diaphragm is held at a DC potential of several kilovolts with respect to the grids. The grids are driven by the audio signal; front and rear grid are driven in antiphase. As a result, a uniform electrostatic field proportional to the audio signal is produced between both grids. This causes a force to be exerted on the charged diaphragm, and its resulting movement drives the air on either side of it.

In virtually all electrostatic loudspeakers the diaphragm is driven by two grids, one on either side, because the force exerted on the diaphragm by a single grid will be unacceptably non-linear, thus causing harmonic distortion. Using grids on both sides cancels out voltage dependent part of non-linearity but leaves charge (attractive force) dependent part. The result is near complete absence of harmonic distortion. In one recent design, the diaphragm is driven with the audio signal, with the static charge located on the grids (Transparent Sound Solutions).

The grids must be able to generate as uniform an electric field as possible, while still allowing for sound to pass through. Suitable grid constructions are therefore perforated metal sheets, a frame with tensioned wire, wire rods, etc.

To generate a sufficient field strength, the audio signal on the grids must be of high voltage. The electrostatic construction is in effect a capacitor, and current is only needed to charge the capacitance created by the diaphragm and the stator plates (previous paragraphs referred to as grids or electrodes). This type of speaker is therefore a high-impedance device. In contrast, a modern electrodynamic cone loudspeaker is a low impedance device, with higher current requirements. As a result, impedance matching is necessary in order to use a normal amplifier. Most often a transformer is used to this end. Construction of this transformer is critical as it must provide a constant (often high) transformation ratio over the entire audible frequency range (i.e., large bandwidth) and so avoid distortion. The transformer is almost always specific to a particular electrostatic speaker. To date, Acoustat and Beveridge built the only commercial "transformer-less" electrostatic loudspeaker. In this design, the audio signal is applied directly to the stators from a built-in high-voltage valve amplifier (as valves are also high impedance devices), without use of a step-up transformer.

== Advantages ==
Advantages of electrostatic loudspeakers include:

1. the very low mass of the diaphragm, which is driven across its whole surface
2. exemplary frequency response (both in amplitude and phase) because the principle of generating force and pressure is almost free from resonances unlike the more common electrodynamic driver.

Musical transparency can be better than in electrodynamic speakers because the radiating surface has much less mass than most other drivers and is therefore far less capable of storing energy to be released later. For example, a typical electrodynamic speaker driver can have a moving mass of tens or hundreds of grams, whereas an electrostatic membrane only has a mass of a few milligrams, several times less than the very lightest of electrodynamic tweeters. The concomitant air load, often insignificant in dynamic speakers, is usually tens of grams because of the large coupling surface, thus contributing to the damping of resonance buildup by the air itself to a significant, though not complete, degree. Electrostatics can also be executed as full-range designs, lacking the usual crossover filters and enclosures that could color or distort the sound.

Since many electrostatic speakers are tall and thin designs without an enclosure, they act as a vertical dipole line source. This makes for rather different acoustic behavior in rooms compared to conventional electrodynamic loudspeakers. Generally speaking, a large-panel dipole radiator is more demanding of a proper physical placement within a room when compared to a conventional box speaker, but, once there, it is less likely to excite bad-sounding room resonances, and its direct-to-reflected sound ratio is higher by some 4–5 decibels. This in turn leads to more accurate stereo reproduction of recordings that contain proper stereo information and venue ambience. Planar (flat) drivers tend to be very directional giving them good imaging qualities, on the condition that they have been carefully placed relative to the listener and the sound-reflecting surfaces in the room. Curved panels have been built, making the placement requirements a bit less stringent, but sacrificing imaging precision somewhat.

== Disadvantages ==
Typical disadvantages include sensitivity to ambient humidity levels and a lack of bass response, due to phase cancellation from a lack of enclosure, but these are not shared by all designs. The bass rolloff 3db point occurs when the narrowest panel dimension equals a quarter wavelength of the radiated frequency for dipole radiators, so for a Quad ESL-63, which is 0.66 meters wide, this occurs at around 129 Hz, comparable to many box speakers (calculated with the speed of sound taken as 343 m/s). There is also the difficult physical challenge of reproducing low frequencies with a vibrating taut film with little excursion amplitude; however, as most diaphragms have a very large surface area compared to cone drivers, only small amplitude excursions are required to put relatively large amounts of energy out. While bass is lacking quantitatively (due to lower excursion than cone drivers) it can be of better quality ('tighter' and without 'booming') than that of electrodynamic (cone) systems. Phase cancellation can be somewhat compensated for by electronic equalization (a so-called shelving circuit that boosts the region inside the audio band where the generated sound pressure drops because of phase cancellation). Nevertheless maximum bass levels cannot be augmented because they are ultimately limited by the membrane's maximum permissible excursion before it comes too close to the high-voltage stators, which may produce electrical arcing and burn holes through it. Recent, technically more advanced solutions for perceived lack of bass include the use of large, curved panels (Sound-Lab, MartinLogan CLS), electrostatic subwoofer panels (Audiostatic, Quad), and long-throw electrostatic elements allowing large diaphragm excursions (Audiostatic). Another trick often practiced is to step up the bass (20–80 Hz) with a higher transformation ratio than the mid and treble.

This relative lack of loud bass is often remedied with a hybrid design using a dynamic loudspeaker, e.g. a subwoofer, to handle lower frequencies, with the electrostatic diaphragm handling middle and high frequencies. Many feel that the best low frequency unit for hybrids are cone drivers mounted on open baffles as dipoles, transmission line woofers or horns, since they possess roughly the same qualities (at least in the bass) as electrostatic speakers, i.e. good transient response, little box coloration, and (ideally) flat frequency response. However, there is often a problem with integrating such a woofer with the electrostatics. This is because most electrostatics are line sources, the sound pressure level of which decreases by 3 dB for each doubling of distance. A cone speaker's sound pressure level, on the other hand, decreases by 6 dB for each doubling of distance because it behaves as a point source. This can be overcome by the theoretically more elegant solution of using conventional cone woofers in an open baffle, or a push-pull arrangement, which produces a bipolar radiation pattern similar to that of the electrostatic membrane. This is still subject to phase cancellation, but cone woofers can be driven to far higher levels due to their longer excursion, thus making equalization to a flat response easier, and they add distortion thereby increasing the area (and therefore the power) under the frequency response graph, making the total low frequency energy higher but the fidelity to the signal lower.

An alternative is to enclose the electrostatic elements and operate them as "monopoles." This avoids the many disadvantages of dipole operation, most importantly a great reduction in room reflections and thus also in adulteration of the recorded ambiance. Since there's no attempt at making the speaker visually see-through, it also allows the application of materials to the rear of the panel to impart full damping of the membrane resonance, which improves transient response. In addition, using relatively small elements with a relatively high crossover frequency, such as 500 Hz, has a number of advantages. It reduces directivity to a degree that offers a reasonably wide sweet spot. It allows more of the 3 dB/octave increase in SPL with frequency to be used, increasing the sensitivity. It does not act as a true line array, so woofers are easier to integrate. Lastly, most of the remaining 3 dB roll-up can be counteracted by filtering the high frequencies from the signal to half or more of the width, which coincidentally widens the dispersion and thus the sweet spot. JansZen speakers incorporate all these alternative features. They also use acoustic suspension woofers (sealed enclosures), which have the lowest group delay of all configurations and thus the best chance of seamlessly integrating with the electrostatics. The panels are also well protected from collecting airborne contaminants, avoiding the need for periodic repairs.

The directionality of electrostatics can also be a disadvantage in that it means the 'sweet spot' where proper stereo imaging can be heard is relatively small, limiting the number of people who can fully enjoy the advantages of the speakers simultaneously. In 1992 Critical Mass introduced the first electrostatic speakers for use in the mobile environment (car audio). Critical Mass engineer and CEO Wayde Alfarone's design capitalized on the directional nature of electrostatics by creating separate sound fields for different seating locations in the vehicle.

Because of their tendency to attract dust, insects, conductive particles, and moisture, electrostatic speaker diaphragms will gradually deteriorate and need periodic replacement. They also need protection measures to physically isolate their high voltage parts from accidental contact with humans and pets. Cost-effective repair and restoration service is available for virtually every current and discontinued electrostatic loudspeaker model.

== Amateur-built speakers ==
Electrostatic speakers enjoy some popularity among do-it-yourself (DIY) loudspeaker builders. They are one of the few types of speakers in which the transducers themselves can be built from scratch by an amateur as basic hardware for complete ESL DIY projects can be found available online. Such supplies include resistors and capacitors for RC circuit frequency equalization, if necessary; step-up transformers; perforated metal sheets or grids and insulating plastics for the stators; polymer film and conductive paint (e.g., a liquid graphite suspension) for the membrane; simple tensioning equipment for proper membrane tuning; and a frame, usually of wood, to hold everything together. A widely read resource by ESL enthusiasts is The Electrostatic Loudspeaker Design Cookbook (ISBN 978-1-882580-00-2) by notable ESL specialist Roger Sanders.

== Commercial speakers ==
Arthur Janszen was granted U.S. patent 2,631,196 in 1953 for an electrostatic loudspeaker. The developers of the Tri-Ergon sound-on-film system had developed a primitive design of electrostatic loudspeaker as early as 1919. JansZen still makes an evolved version of his original design.

=== Quad Electroacoustics ===
The first fully successful full-range electrostatic speaker, and also among the most influential, was produced in 1957: the Quad Electrostatic Loudspeaker (Quad ESL, later known as the ESL-57) from Quad Electroacoustics, of Huntingdon, England. These were shaped somewhat like a home electric radiator curved slightly on the vertical axis. They were widely admired for their clarity and precision, but can be difficult to run while achieving low frequency bass output.

The Quad ESLs were designed by Peter Walker, founder of the company, and David Williamson. The first in the series was the ESL-57, influenced by U.S. patent 1,983,377 developed by Edward W. Kellogg for General Electric in 1934. It was introduced in 1955, put into commercial production in 1957, and discontinued only in 1985.

In 1981, Quad introduced the ESL-63 as a successor to the ESL-57. It attempted to address both the deficiency in bass reproduction of the ESL-57 and its extreme directionality at high frequencies. The latter goal is achieved by splitting the stators into eight concentric rings, each fed with a slight time delay compared to the ring immediately inwards, thereby attempting to emulate a point source.

Although the ESL-63 was discontinued in 1999, Quad maintains production of electrostatic speakers. Quad introduced the ESL-988 and its larger variant the ESL-989 in 1999, the ESL-2805 and ESL-2905 in 2005, and the ESL-2812 and ESL-2912 in 2017, that incorporate electronic and transducer refinements.

=== Other manufacturers ===
Popular manufacturers of electrostatic speakers include MartinLogan, KEF, Quad, SoundLab. Manufacturers who only make electrostatic-type speakers include SoundLab, Audiostatic, JansZen and Sanders Sound Systems (previously Innersound).

Other manufacturers currently producing electrostatic loudspeakers include Solosound, King's Audio, Panphonics, Cadence Audio, T+A and Silberstatic, Blanko.nu. BenQ produces a portable electrostatic Bluetooth speaker. Audiostatic claim to make the only full range electrostatic loudspeaker.

MartinLogan, JansZen, Metrum Acoustics, Sanders Sound Systems, and Sound-Lab, and others build hybrid designs with conventional woofers or subwoofers.

Among electrostatic full-range speakers that are no longer made is the KLH 9, the earliest US full-range design, AHL Tolteque, Acoustat, Servo-Statik and Immersion from Australia.

== See also ==
- Magnetostatic loudspeaker
