= Monsoon (speakers) =

Monsoon logo

Monsoon is a brand of loudspeakers, originally automotive speaker systems and later computer speakers. Monsoon was originally associated with OEM-sourced automotive audio speaker systems, notably supplied on a number of General Motors products and then later expanded onto other manufacturers such as Volkswagen. The brand name was also licensed to Sonigistix, a Richmond, B.C., Canada company, and applied to their line of computer multimedia speakers.

== Sonigistix ==
Sonigistix started out as a project out of the UBC Electrical Engineering company and existed for two years on the UBC campus. Its founder was Brent Bolleman and its first raison d'être was to refine and market an electrostatic computer product based on the design of Quad Electrostatics. Electrostatic speakers have their own problems due to the need for the membrane requiring high voltage, which is dangerous and has the requirement of a step up transformer, which is costly. The ultimate desire was to have a speaker that looked great and sounded great, so the conversion to planar magnetic design, which had problems of its own but easier dealt with, most notably was the need for rare earth magnets, which were expensive. Much of the focus of the transition focused on how to reduce this cost element and make the speakers more appealing to a larger pool of consumers. The early unnamed company started sending out prototypes to United Technologies. Through this the company made contacts with Woody Jackson, a high end audio products expert based in Little Rock Arkansas, and Dave Clark an audio engineer who had ties to Delphi based in Detroit. Clark designed the subwoofer part of the package. Another challenge as the planar magnetic design had a bottom end of 100 Hz and it was key to make the crossover design seamless.

By 2000, Sonigistix expanded its product line and the Monsoon brand into the consumer computer multimedia market. The company 's flat-panel speaker design were based on planar magnetic technology licensed from Eminent Technology, which developed the original concept. Within the following years, Sonigistix's assets were acquired by Eastech, an Asian technology company that manufactures consumer audio products.

As for Sonigistix, a privately held company by that name currently resides in Little Rock, Arkansas, U.S.A. An online company profile on goliath.ecnext.com lists this Little Rock company, being Woody Jackson as being in the home audio/video industry. An owner's manual for the MM-700/iM-700 Flat Panel Audio System with a copyright of 2000 shows the Monsoon Multimedia Sales office address as Little Rock, Arkansas.

== Eastech ==
Monsoon-branded products continued for a time under Eastech (under the Level 9 name), but by late 2004 Monsoon computer speakers had essentially disappeared from the U.S. marketplace. By 2005, Eastech no longer sold Monsoon speakers.

== Legacy ==
Monsoon-branded speakers, whether sold by Sonigistix or Level 9, have developed an almost cult-like following due to their perceived high sound quality and accuracy, particularly uncommon (at the time of their run) for the personal computer marketplace. Dedicated owners of Monsoon flat panel speakers will often go to great lengths to keep their old Monsoons running, primarily because it is assumed that replacements made and sold by other manufacturers may be inferior. When the Richmond, B.C., factory closed, a loudspeaker repair shop in Vancouver, B.C., obtained the remaining stock of tweeters, midranges and woofers as replacement parts. The replacement parts were exhausted by 2008, leaving the use of salvaged parts as the only options for units that have failed. The most common issue with midrange and tweeter elements is corroded NeFeB magnets. Sadly, this corrosion is a terminal condition and cannot be reversed or repaired, however there is rumour around the "Monsoon Community" that this problem may have been resolved in some of the final production runs.

As for the Monsoon brand, it remains a trademark of Delphi. This allows GM to exploit the reputation that the Sonigistix products developed, by using the Monsoon brand for their current in-car entertainment products, although made by several other companies. Currently Monsoon in-car audio is optional on several GM cars.
