= Active bass trap =

Sound dampening equipment

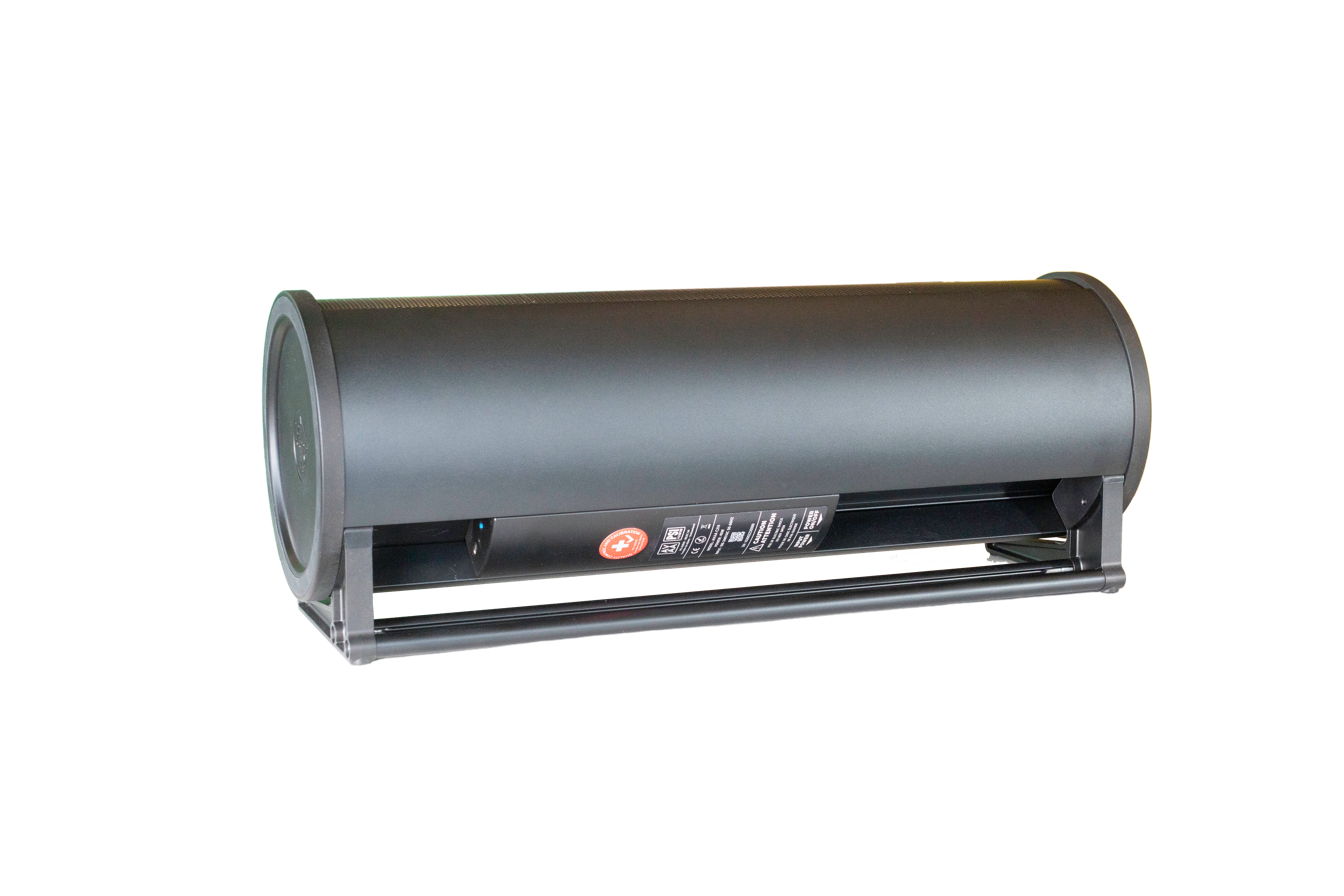
Active bass trap - AVAA C214

Active bass trap is a type of bass trap that uses electronic sensing and actuation to reduce low-frequency sound energy and room mode resonances.

Unlike conventional active noise-cancellation systems, which generate a secondary sound field to produce destructive interference, active bass traps absorb acoustic energy by controlling the acoustic impedance at the absorber. In impedance-controlled systems, lowering the acoustic impedance presented to the surrounding air allows more low-frequency energy to be absorbed rather than reflected into the room.

The acoustic impedance of the loudspeaker diaphragm can be controlled by electrical or electronic means, changing the way the transducer interacts with the surrounding acoustic field. By selecting an appropriate impedance, the absorber can dissipate acoustic energy over a desired low-frequency range.

Academic research into electroacoustic absorbers subsequently led to commercial implementations. PSI Audio subsequently developed the AVAA (Active Velocity Acoustic Absorber) with academic and industrial partners. A prototype was developed by 2015, and the AVAA C20 entered production in 2015/2016. The digitally controlled C214 was introduced in 2023. Its technology uses a microphone and electroacoustic transducer to control the acoustic impedance in front of the device, allowing low-frequency energy to enter the absorber rather than being reflected into the room. The C20 uses analogue circuitry, while the C214 uses digital control.

== Advantages over passive bass traps ==
Compared with conventional passive bass traps, active bass traps can provide effective low-frequency absorption from substantially smaller structures. Passive porous absorbers require increasing thickness or air gaps to absorb effectively at lower frequencies, while passive resonant absorbers typically provide effective absorption over a relatively narrow frequency range. Active bass traps use electronic control of acoustic impedance to provide compact low-frequency absorption and, depending on the design, a broader bandwidth. They can also have an equivalent absorption area substantially greater than their physical surface area; experimental electroacoustic absorbers have demonstrated significant damping of low-frequency room modes with a relatively small treatment area.
