= Bass trap =

Sound dampening equipment

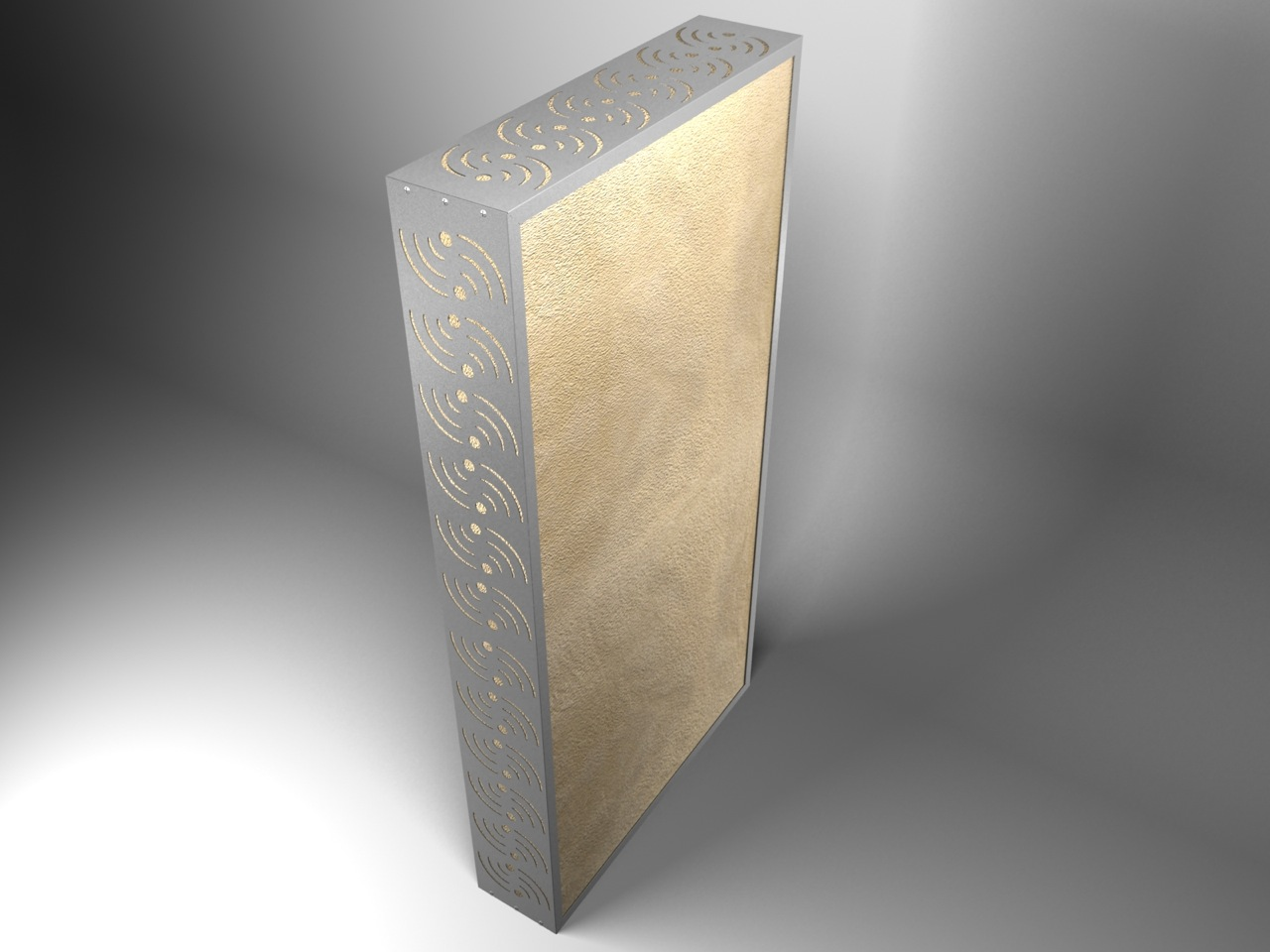
A typical bass trap

Bass traps re acoustic absorbers designed to reduce the amplitude of low-frequency resonances in enclosed spaces and thereby improve low-frequency response. They are commonly used in recording studios, mastering rooms,home theatres, and other critical-listening environments.

Bass traps are generally classified as porous absorbers or resonant absorbers. Porous absorbers dissipate acoustic energy through losses associated with airflow through a porous material, while resonant absorbers use a mechanical resonance to absorb energy within a specific frequency range. Resonant absorbers include panel absorbers and Helmholtz resonators. The two types differ primarily in their frequency range, tuning requirements, and physical dimensions.

== General description—types ==
Bass traps can be broadly classified as porous absorbers or resonant absorbers. Resonant absorbers include panel absorbers and Helmholtz resonators.

Porous absorbers dissipate acoustic energy through friction and viscous losses as air moves through a porous material. Their absorption is generally broadband and does not require mechanical tuning, although effective absorption at low frequencies typically requires substantial thickness.

Resonant absorbers use mechanical resonance to absorb acoustic energy within a defined frequency range. They are designed or tuned to target particular frequencies and can provide effective low-frequency absorption without requiring the thickness of a comparable porous absorber. Their bandwidth can be broadened through design modifications, such as incorporating porous material or combining multiple resonators tuned to different frequencies. Porous absorbers often incorporate a foil or paper facing to reflect frequencies above 500 Hz. Facing also improves low bass absorption by translating the physical compression of air at the facing into physical compression of the fibers that are in contact with the facing while also maintaining the resistive loss of air as it is driven through the bulk of the fiber by the facing.

== Design concepts for building bass traps ==
=== Resonating bass traps ===
Resonating bass traps will absorb sound with high efficiency at their fundamental frequency of resonance. As such, a knowledge of the frequencies of resonances which require damping is helpful before designing and constructing a resonating bass trap. This can be attained by calculation of the room's modes or by direct measurement of the room itself.

Resonating absorbers can be broadened in the frequency range of efficacy to some degree by either introducing porous absorptive material to the interior of the vessel, by constraining the vibrations of the panel or membrane, or by installing an array of resonating devices each tuned to adjacent frequency ranges so that collectively the array functions over a broadened range of sounds. Such devices can be enormously effective over their tuned range, but can take up a great deal of space, especially when installed in arrays, and thus are sometimes not a practical solution.

==== Panel absorber ====
A simple panel resonator can be built to hang on a wall by building a wooden frame, adding several inches of mineral wool to the inside, and fitting a sheet of plywood over the top attached only at the edges. A small gap should be left between the panel and the acoustic insulation so that the panel is free to resonate. Panel resonance can be enhanced by reducing the point of connection between the panel and the frame by means of narrow spacer material such as a loop of wire or welding rod run along the edge of the frame so that the panel is perched on a thin edge. Approximate full sheet [4' × 8'] plywood panel resonances when mounted on a 1"×4" frame 3.5" deep are:

- 1/8" plywood = 150 Hz
- 1/4" plywood = 110 Hz
- 3/8" plywood = 87 Hz

==== Helmholtz resonator ====
Other common resonating bass traps are forms of the Helmholtz resonator—such as either a stiff walled box with a hole in one side [a port], or a series of slats over-mounted across the face as a stiff-walled box forming narrow openings in the cracks between the slat members.

=== Porous absorber bass traps ===
The low-frequency performance of a porous bass trap is governed chiefly by its airflow resistivity and its thickness: effective absorption requires a depth that is a significant fraction of the wavelength at the target frequency, which is why porous traps intended for the deep bass are physically large.

A bass trap generally comprises a core absorbent damp material, a frame, and a covering for aesthetic reasons.

- Core: Materials such as mineral wool and semi-rigid fiberglass, which offer a moderate airflow resistivity, are commonly used for the core.
- Frame: A steel exterior frame is preferred, although wood skeleton frames are common. The frame acts as a housing, allowing mounting to walls and ceilings, and also anchors the covering material.
- Covering: Porous fabric (similar to speaker grill cloth) is usually used.

=== Active bass traps ===
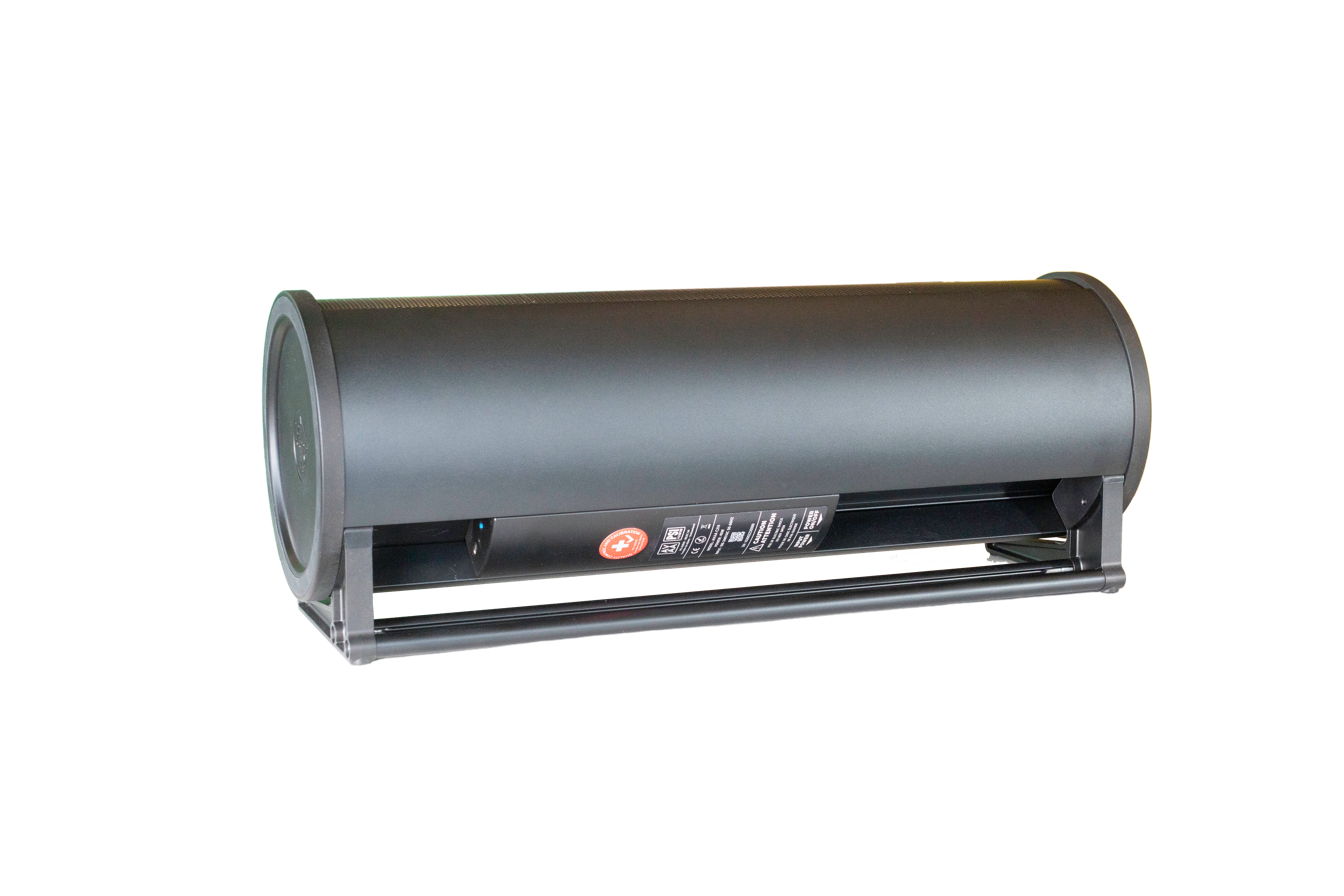
Active bass trap - AVAA C214

An active bass trap operates on a principle similar to that of a resonant bass trap, but incorporates an actively controlled membrane. Unlike a conventional resonant trap, the membrane can be driven at frequencies beyond its natural resonance, enabling broadband rather than frequency-specific absorption. Moreover, the active membrane can achieve greater excursion and present a lower acoustic impedance to the incident sound field. It therefore acts as an acoustic sink, actively absorbing acoustic pressure from a larger surrounding area. Consequently, its equivalent absorption area can substantially exceed its physical dimensions, particularly at low frequencies where wavelengths are long.

== Positioning ==
Since low frequency resonances in a room have their points of maximum or minimum pressure in the corners of the room, resonant bass traps mounted in these positions will be the most efficient, while porous traps are most efficient at the points of high particle velocity such as 1/4 the desired wavelength away from the wall. Bass traps are typically used to attenuate modal resonances and so exact placement depends on which room mode one is trying to target. Bass traps typically combine structural mechanisms that can work at both positions of high particle velocity/low pressure (thick fiberglass) and high pressure/low particle velocity (membranes).

Porous bass trap absorbers need to be very thick to be effective at lower frequencies so they tend to be allocated either as diagonal wedges in the corners or as thick rectangular bulk behind false walls where they are out of the way and less likely to disrupt higher frequencies or room function. Air gap behind a porous panel absorber e.g. straddling a corner also helps to ensure it protrudes more into the room where there is more air velocity, improving its velocity-based absorption and extending its bandwidth while inducing some ripple in its absorption spectrum. Resonant bass trap absorbers need to be at a pressure maximum and tend to be thinner, so they are more conveniently and effectively positioned flat against a wall in a corner where the pressure is maximum, rather than straddling a corner where there is more velocity.

Standard practice is to investigate the applicability of porous bass trap absorbers before investigating resonant or hybridized bass trap absorbers. Complementary methods to use in combination with porous absorption include drywall/stud construction of walls/ceiling and filled with insulation as a form of highly damped resonant bass trapping using the drywall itself as the membrane. The combination of inherently lossy resonant room boundaries and paper or foil faced porous bass trap absorption deep in the tricorners (where three room boundaries meet) is often sufficient to attain acceptable bass response even in listening rooms with somewhat problematic resonances.

Adjusting the listening position within the room boundaries and elevating the seating with a riser that is filled with porous absorption is one more method that can improve bass response without resorting to resonant bass trapping, while simultaneously improving home theater screen visibility.

Small listening rooms suffer a paucity of low frequency resonances with gaps between them, so another complementary method is adding a subwoofer to drive the room resonances from an optimal physical location that minimizes ripple in the frequency response at the listening position. Yet another complementary method is splitting an existing subwoofer allocation up into multiple smaller subwoofers in spatially separated locations that increase the degrees of freedom available to tune the response with. Multiple subwoofers also tend to smooth the bass response across a larger listening area and are often easier to place for good bass response than a single larger subwoofer (or no subwoofer).

If the response is somewhat uniform across all listening positions using these methods, equalization can be used to shape the bass response to the desired target and further smooth out any remaining ripple.

Some combination of porous absorption with these complementary methods is typically preferred for their simplicity, affordability, and convenience, but resonant bass traps are more effective for absorbing strong room resonances where the aforementioned complementary methods are inadequate or impractical, particularly when the geometry of the room causes problematic narrow-band resonances that affect the low bass and the composition of the room boundaries is highly reflective rather than acoustically lossy.

== Performance measurement ==
The absorption performance of bass traps is typically quantified using the absorption coefficient, measured as a function of frequency. Two standardized laboratory methods are commonly used for this purpose.

ISO 354 specifies a reverberation room method in which a specimen of the absorber material is placed in a large reverberant chamber and the resulting change in reverberation time is used to calculate the random-incidence absorption coefficient. This method allows the test specimen to be mounted in a representative configuration, including corner placement for bass traps. However, reverberation room measurements at low frequencies are affected by the modal behavior of the chamber itself, which introduces measurement uncertainty below approximately 200 Hz.

ISO 10534-2 describes an impedance tube method that measures the absorption coefficient at normal incidence using a small sample placed at one end of a rigid tube. While this method provides precise and repeatable results, the tube diameter limits the upper test frequency, and the normal-incidence condition does not capture the diffuse-field performance relevant to room acoustic applications.

Bass trap manufacturers commonly report the noise reduction coefficient (NRC) derived from ISO 354 data, but this single-number rating averages absorption at 250, 500, 1000, and 2000 Hz and therefore does not reflect low-frequency performance below 250 Hz. Practitioners evaluating bass traps should examine the full frequency-dependent absorption curve, particularly in the 50 to 300 Hz range where bass traps are intended to operate.
