= Networked Robotics Corporation =

American robotics company

- Company type: Corporation
- Industry: Scientific Automation & Instrumentation
- Founded: 2004
- Headquarters: Pleasanton, California
- Products: Digital Sensors, Network Hardware, Scientific Instrument Interfaces
- Website: networkedrobotics.com

Networked Robotics Corporation is an American scientific automation company that designs and manufactures electronic devices that monitor scientific instruments, scientific processes, and environmental conditions via the internet.

Networked Robotics technology is used in the biotechnologies industry—including stem cell automation, medical industry, academia, food industry in efforts to enhance U.S. Food and Drug Administration (FDA) regulatory compliance, quality, and loss prevention for their operations.

== History ==
Networked Robotics was founded in 2004 at the Northwestern University Technology Innovation Center by ex-Pfizer informatics researchers. The company's founders worked for almost 20 years in the automation of scientific processes for G.D. Searle & Company, Monsanto, Pharmacia, and Pfizer where they were responsible for the automation of experiments in inflammation. Businessman Charles W. Woodford was a founding board member.

In 2006, Networked Robotics announced the introduction of Tempurity™, a network-based, real-time temperature monitoring system, designed to collect temperatures over a wide area network. Tempurity includes an alarm system in which a user is notified by phone, text messaging, or e-mail when the area or device to be monitored falls outside of a set environmental range. The software was developed to meet FDA standards and works with rooms, ovens, incubators, refrigerators, freezers and commercial ultra low temperature freezers.

== Information ==
In 2005, as the company was developing their automation technology, Networked Robotics hosted an international game server for an online competition of the video game Medal of Honor (video game series). More than 280 daily contests were held, with winners from 25 different nations. Contests for 2004 ended on February 8, 2005, the end of the lunar (Chinese) New Year. The countries with the most winners on each continent were declared Networked Robotics continental champions. Over 250,000 players from 66 countries and all US states have participated in Networked Robotics competition.
