= Scott M. Ladd =

American judge

Scott Mason Ladd
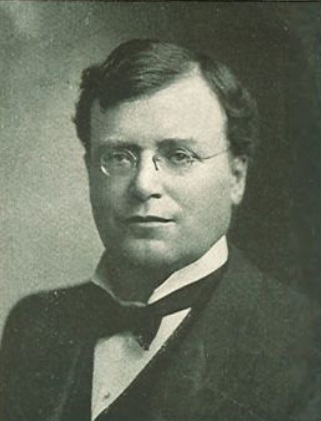

Justice of the Iowa Supreme Court
- In office 1897–1920

Personal details
- Born: June 22, 1855 Sharon, Wisconsin
- Died: April 14, 1931 (aged 75) Des Moines, Iowa
- Spouse: Emma Cromer Ladd
- Children: Mason Ladd
- Education: Carthage College; University of Iowa
- Occupation: Jurist

Scott Mason Ladd (June 22, 1855 – April 14, 1931) was an American lawyer and judge who served as a justice of the Iowa Supreme Court from 1897 to 1920.

Born in Sharon, Wisconsin to John Ladd and Sarah Willmarth, Ladd graduated from Carthage College then located in Illinois where he met his wife Emma. He then studied at the University of Iowa, where he also graduated from, and was admitted to the Iowa bar. Ladd was a judge in the circuit court from 1887 to 1896. He was a justice of the Iowa Supreme Court from 1897 to 1920. He is the father of Scott Mason Ladd Jr. who acted as Dean of both the University of Iowa College of Law and the Florida State University College of Law. He died in Des Moines, Iowa.

Political offices
Preceded by	Justice of the Iowa Supreme Court; 1897–1920	Succeeded by
