= Martha Nessler Hayden =

American artist

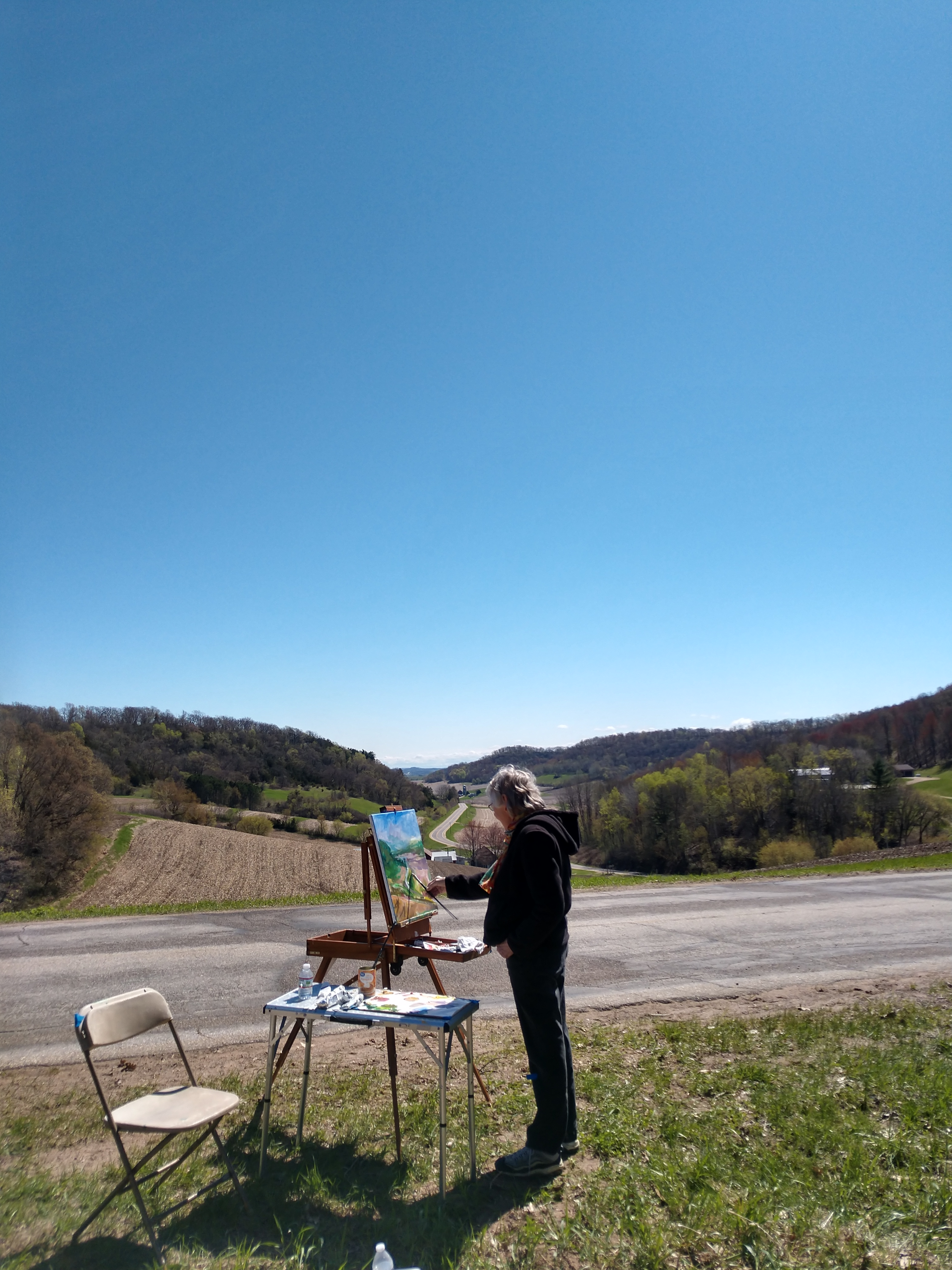
- Martha Hayden at work (May 2019)
- Born: Martha Nessler; 1936 (age 89–90); Evanston, Illinois, US
- Other names: Martha N. Hayden, Martha Hayden
- Education: Art Institute of Chicago

Martha Nessler Hayden (born 1936) is an American artist, known for Modernist landscape painting and artist books. Hayden lives and works in Sharon, Wisconsin, in a historic Victorian home.

She has produced art in many mediums including oil paint, acrylic paint, watercolor, gouache, fabric art, ceramics and enameling. Over the years, she has also maintained studios in New York City in Astoria (1995–2001) and on the Lower East Side (2001–2017).

== Early life and education ==
Martha Nessler was born in 1936 and she grew up in Evanston, Illinois. The daughter of librarian Minerva Kraft Nessler and cheese equipment industrial designer Aldo Edward Nessler. Her maternal grandfather was Charles Herbert Kraft, one of the brothers who founded Kraft Cheese Company.

Hayden attended Bradley University for two years (1953–1955), majoring in the Ceramic Arts before transferring to the Art Institute of Chicago where she majored in to Drawing-Painting-Illustration (DPI), and received her BFA degree in 1961.

Following graduation from the School of the Art Institute of Chicago, she used a Byron Lathrop Foreign Traveling Fellowship to study at Schule des Sehens (“School of Seeing”) at the International Summer Academy for Visual Arts in Salzburg, Austria, with Oskar Kokoschka in 1962.

== Career ==
She has traveled to Mexico to paint on multiple occasions and during these trips, she has spent time in San Miguel de Allende, the Yucatán Peninsula, and Morelia. A significant series of works done during the 1970s are her landscapes from Mexico. These were painted outside, on location, in rural Mexico during the winters of 1970-71 and 1971–72. These paintings stand out from other landscapes done by Martha because the Mexican sky is typically a stronger shade of blue than that seen in Wisconsin, and the vegetation was also much different. Donald Key, Art Critic for the Milwaukee Journal Sentinel, described these works in. the 1970s as "profuse in color and immediately responsive to atmospheres and objects."

In the 1970s she eventually settled down in Sharon, Wisconsin. James Auer, Milwaukee Journal Art Editor, in his 1972 review of her exhibit at Bradley Galleries in Milwaukee, described her as the "Philip Pearlstein of kraft paper, achieving a remarkable plasticity and sensuality with the simplest of subject matter"

During the 1980s, Martha Hayden painted the world that surrounded her in rural Wisconsin. Her largest work was created in 1985, a mural portraying the history of Beloit, Wisconsin, installed on the walls of Beloit City Hall. The City of Beloit commissioned this work from Martha Hayden in 1983.

Two of her most unusual works were on display at the U.S Smithsonian Museum in 1988. They are two wooden eggs on which scenes of the Wisconsin farmland and Wisconsin lakes are painted. Martha Hayden was one of 200 American Artists chosen to paint these special eggs which were also on view during the White House Easter Egg Roll.

One of the oil paintings that Martha created in 1989 is of bosc pears in a rustic setting, this painting was purchased by the Nebraska State Art Collection.

The Naperville Art League chose in 1990, Martha Hayden's painting of a giant flower for Best of Show Award at the Riverwalk Art Festival.

In 2001, she was included in the exhibition: "11th Annual Remarkable Women Show." held in Peltz Gallery in Milwaukee.

Hayden has also created a series of artist books, and one of her books is in the Harvard University Fine Arts Library collections. Her artwork is in various museum collections including the Chazen Museum of Art (previously known as Elvehjem Art Center), Salzburg Museum, São Paulo Museum of Art, and Art Institute of Chicago.
