= Sharon, Wisconsin =

Sharon
- Village
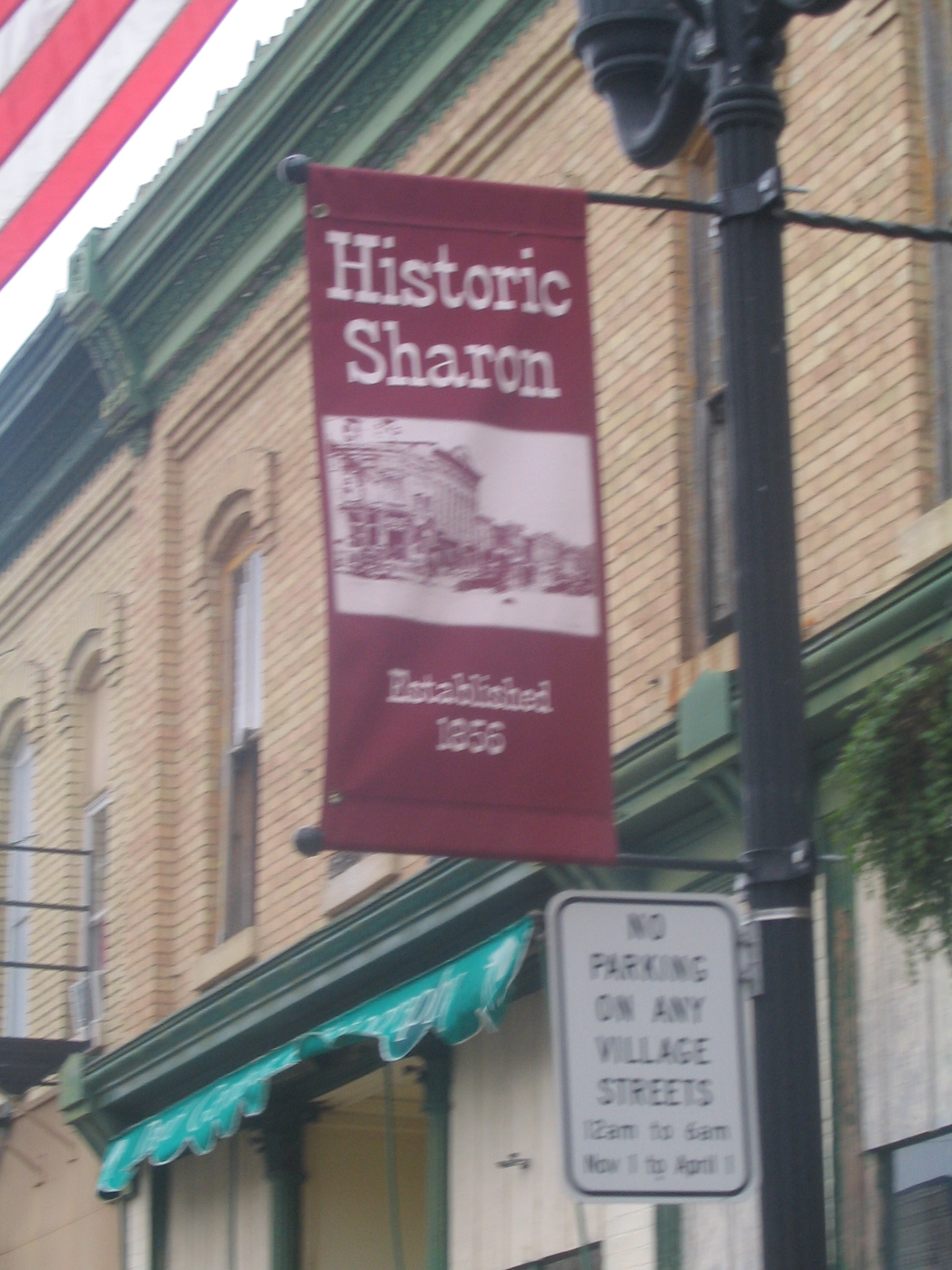
- Banner within the Grace and Pearl Historic District in Sharon

- Location of Sharon in Walworth County, Wisconsin.

- Location within the state of Wisconsin
- Coordinates: 42°30′9″N 88°43′47″W
- Country: United States
- State: Wisconsin
- County: Walworth

Area
  - Total: 1.73 sq mi (4.47 km^{2})
  - Land: 1.73 sq mi (4.47 km^{2})
  - Water: 0 sq mi (0.00 km^{2})

Population (2020)
  - Total: 1,586
  - Density: 902.0/sq mi (348.28/km^{2})
- Time zone: UTC-6 (Central (CST))
  - Summer (DST): UTC-5 (CDT)
- ZIP Codes: 53585
- Area code: 262
- FIPS code: 55-72875
- Website: www.villageofsharon.com

Sharon is a village in Walworth County, Wisconsin, United States. The population was 1,586 at the 2020 census. The village is situated within the Town of Sharon.

== Etymology ==
The village is named after Sharon Springs, New York.

== Geography ==
Sharon is located at 42°30′8″N 88°43′46″W (42.502412, -88.729681).

According to the United States Census Bureau, the village has a total area of 1.66 square miles (4.30 km^{2}), all land.

== Demographics ==
Historical population
Census	Pop.	Note	%±
1880	657		—
1890	878		33.6%
1900	945		7.6%
1910	879		−7.0%
1920	908		3.3%
1930	733		−19.3%
1940	812		10.8%
1950	1,013		24.8%
1960	1,167		15.2%
1970	1,216		4.2%
1980	1,280		5.3%
1990	1,250		−2.3%
2000	1,549		23.9%
2010	1,605		3.6%
2020	1,586		−1.2%
U.S. Decennial Census

=== 2010 census ===
As of the census of 2010, there were 1,605 people, 594 households, and 406 families living in the village. The population density was 966.9 inhabitants per square mile (373.3/km^{2}). There were 714 housing units at an average density of 430.1 per square mile (166.1/km^{2}). The racial makeup of the village was 86.7% White, 0.2% African American, 0.6% Native American, 0.4% Asian, 10.5% from other races, and 1.6% from two or more races. Hispanic or Latino of any race were 16.5% of the population.

There were 594 households, of which 38.7% had children under the age of 18 living with them, 49.5% were married couples living together, 12.8% had a female householder with no husband present, 6.1% had a male householder with no wife present, and 31.6% were non-families. 24.7% of all households were made up of individuals, and 6.4% had someone living alone who was 65 years of age or older. The average household size was 2.70 and the average family size was 3.24.

The median age in the village was 35.3 years. 28.2% of residents were under the age of 18; 8.3% were between the ages of 18 and 24; 27.7% were from 25 to 44; 27.1% were from 45 to 64; and 8.8% were 65 years of age or older. The gender makeup of the village was 50.8% male and 49.2% female.

=== 2000 census ===
As of the census of 2000, there were 1,549 people, 565 households, and 402 families living in the village. The population density was 1,699.3 people per square mile (657.2/km^{2}). There were 602 housing units at an average density of 660.4 per square mile (255.4/km^{2}). The racial makeup of the village was 93.35% White, 0.58% Black or African American, 0.45% Native American, 0.45% Asian, 3.62% from other races, and 1.55% from two or more races. 7.30% of the population were Hispanic or Latino of any race.

There were 565 households, out of which 40.0% had children under the age of 18 living with them, 57.3% were married couples living together, 8.7% had a female householder with no husband present, and 28.7% were non-families. 25.5% of all households were made up of individuals, and 7.8% had someone living alone who was 65 years of age or older. The average household size was 2.74 and the average family size was 3.29.

In the village, the population was spread out, with 31.3% under the age of 18, 8.8% from 18 to 24, 31.2% from 25 to 44, 19.8% from 45 to 64, and 8.8% who were 65 years of age or older. The median age was 32 years. For every 100 females, there were 102.5 males. For every 100 females age 18 and over, there were 104.2 males.

The median income for a household in the village was $39,330, and the median income for a family was $45,500. Males had a median income of $34,097 versus $23,438 for females. The per capita income for the village was $15,779. About 9.5% of families and 10.4% of the population were below the poverty line, including 12.7% of those under age 18 and 18.3% of those age 65 or over.

== Culture ==
Since 1997, the Sharon Main Street Association has organized an annual "Model A Day", a gathering of Model A collectors and enthusiasts. This event draws over 300 cars each year. Sharon is one of the greatest (by percentage) Polish-American communities in the U.S.

== Notable people ==
- William P. Allen, Wisconsin State Representative, lived in Sharon.
- John W. Brownson, New York politician, moved in Sharon.
- John Brownson, Wisconsin State Representative, lived in Sharon.
- Travis Frederick, NFL Player, lived in Sharon.
- Walter Samuel Goodland, Governor of Wisconsin, was born in Sharon.
- Martha Nessler Hayden, painter
- Scott M. Ladd, Justice of the Iowa Supreme Court, was born in Sharon.
- George Perring, MLB player, was born in Sharon.
- George Sykes or Sikes, former Representative and retired farmer, moved here with his wife from the Town of Sharon, and died here
- Charles W. Woodford, Illinois Treasurer, was born in Sharon.
- Riley S. Young, Speaker of the Wisconsin State Assembly, in Sharon.

== See also ==
- List of villages in Wisconsin
