= William P. Allen (politician) =

American politician (1818–1901)

Member of the Wisconsin State Assembly
- In office 1854

Personal details
- Born: William Potter Allen; July 21, 1818 New York, U.S.
- Died: September 1, 1901 (aged 83) Sharon, Wisconsin, U.S.
- Party: Whig
- Occupation: Politician

William Potter Allen (July 21, 1818 – September 1, 1901) was an American politician who served as a member of the Wisconsin State Assembly in 1854.

== Biography ==
Allen was born on July 21, 1818, in New York. He died on September 1, 1901, in Sharon, Wisconsin.

== Career ==
Allen was a member of the Assembly in 1854. He was affiliated with the Whig Party.
