= Charles W. Woodford =

American businessman and politician

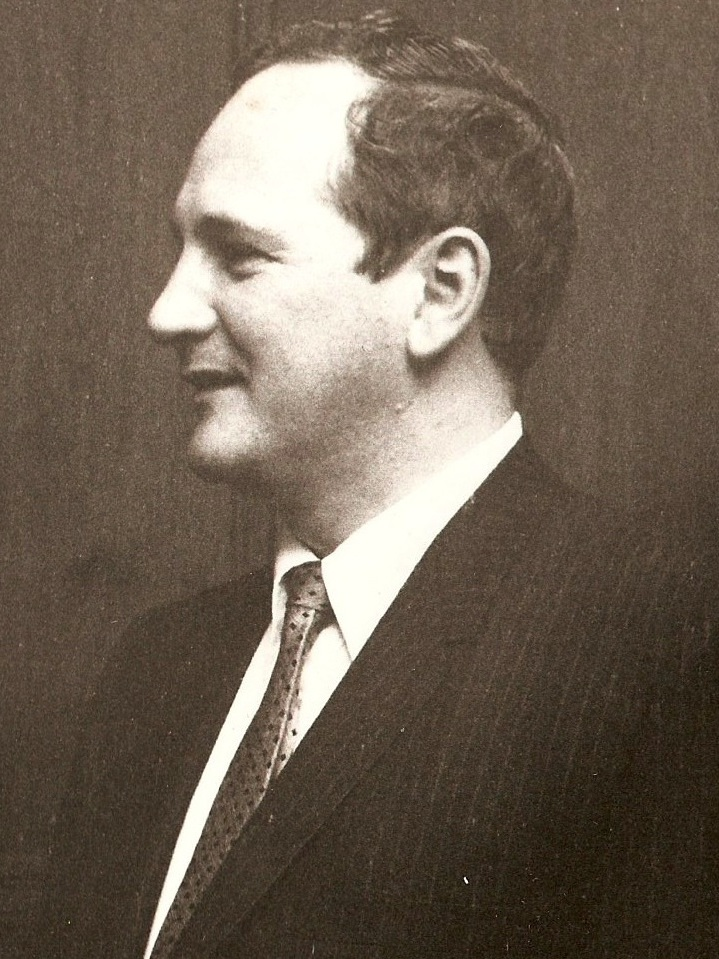
- Woodford in 1968

64th Illinois Treasurer
- In office November 17, 1970 – January 11, 1971
- Governor: Richard B. Ogilvie
- Preceded by: Adlai Stevenson III
- Succeeded by: Alan J. Dixon

Personal details
- Born: December 23, 1931 Sharon, Wisconsin, U.S.
- Died: February 21, 2009 (aged 77) Chicago, Illinois, U.S.

Charles W. Woodford (December 23, 1931 – February 21, 2009) was an American businessman and Illinois Treasurer from 1970 to 1971.

== Early life and education ==
Woodford was born in Sharon, Wisconsin and received his bachelor's degree from Beloit College.

== Career ==
He started his business career with Brown Brothers and Harriman and Company in Chicago, Illinois. In 1970, he became Illinois Treasurer when Adlai Stevenson III was elected to the United States Senate and served until Alan J. Dixon became the Illinois Treasurer in 1971. He chaired the 1973 Illinois Budget Task Force and helped implement the office of the Illinois Comptroller. Woodford was later vice president and treasurer of the Horace Mann Corporation. He also worked with other banks and insurance companies including the American National Bank and Trust Company and the First National Bank of Chicago as executive vice president. In 1982 he became the chief executive officer of Trust Services of America, a division of California Federal Bank and from 1994 to 1996 he was an executive of Sanwa Bank. He became a founding board member of tech startup Networked Robotics Corporation, a scientific automation company, in 2004. He lived in Hanover, Illinois and died there.
