= PSI Audio =

Swiss audio equipment manufacturer

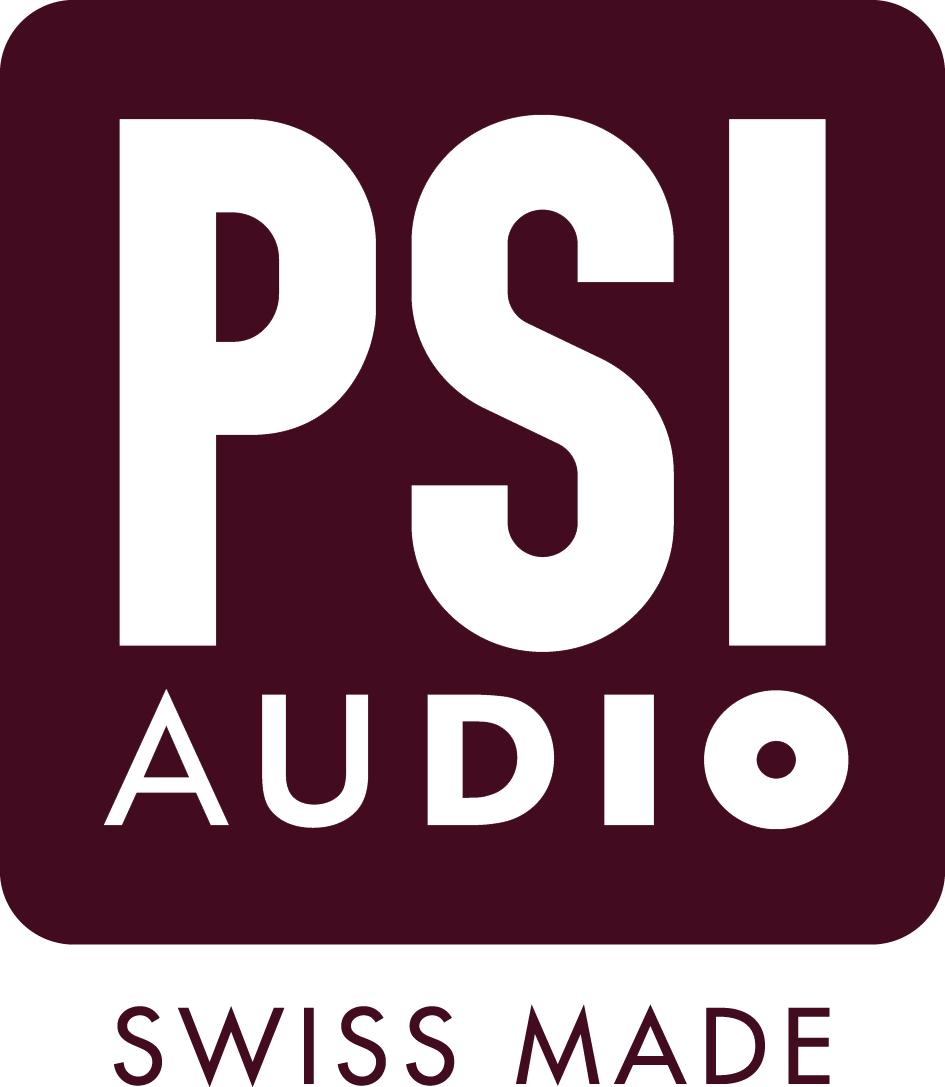
- Industry: Studio monitors and active acoustic treatment systems
- Founded: 1977, Switzerland
- Founder: Alain Roux
- Headquarters: Yverdon-les-Bains, Switzerland
- Area served: Worldwide
- Website: www.psiaudio.swiss

PSI Audio is a Swiss manufacturer of professional studio monitors, loudspeakers, and active acoustic treatment systems. The company is best known for its emphasis on analogue signal processing and proprietary loudspeaker technologies. Its studio monitors are characterized by accurate and transparent sound reproduction with neutral tonal balance.

== History ==
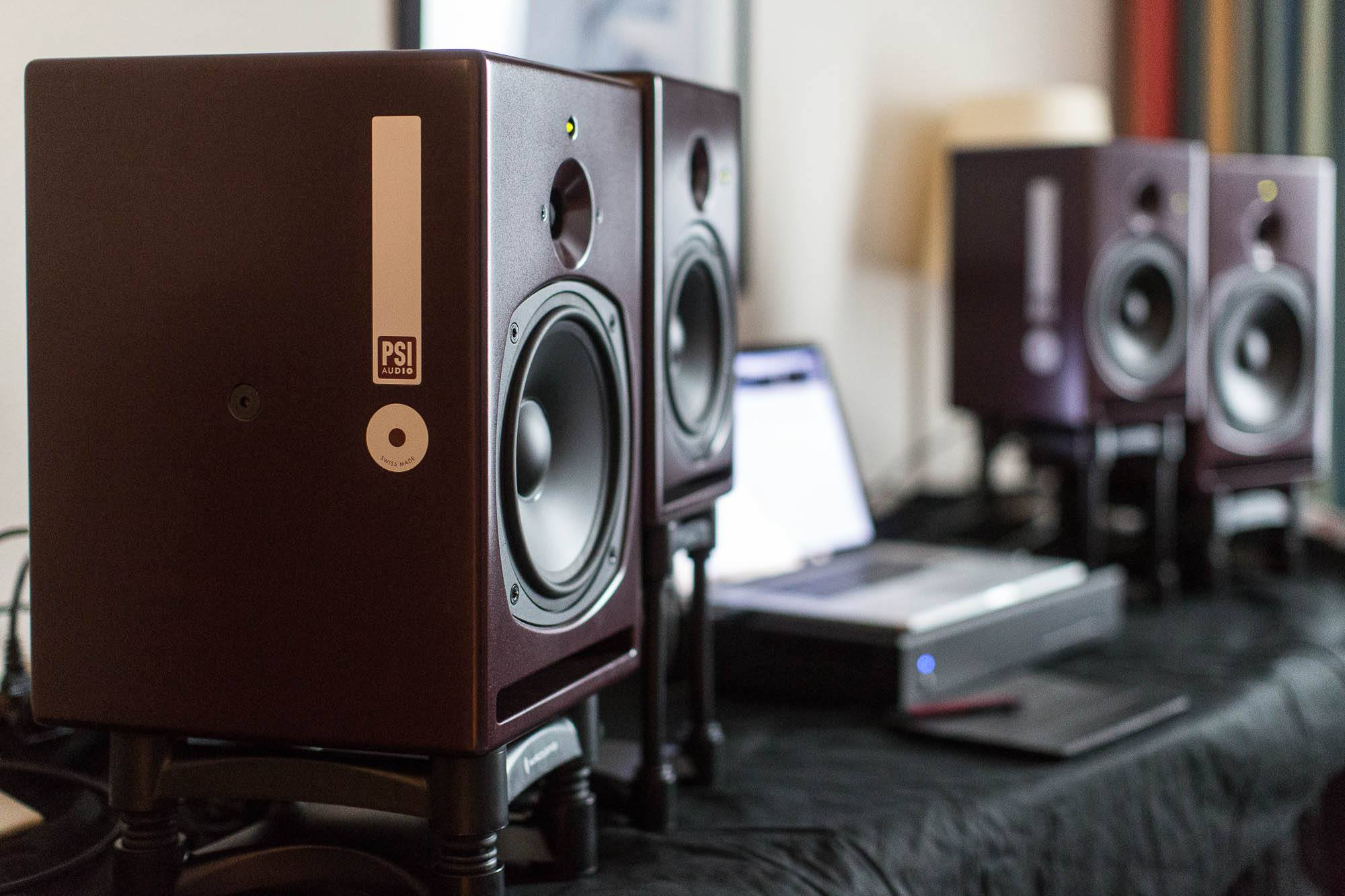
PSI A21 and A17 studio monitors

Audio engineer Alain Roux began designing and building loudspeakers while studying electrical engineering at the École Polytechnique Fédérale de Lausanne in 1975. In 1977 he established Roux Electroacoustique, initially producing loudspeakers for hi-fi and public address applications. The company later expanded into professional monitoring systems.

In 1988 the company became Relec SA and relocated to Yverdon-les-Bains. During this period it manufactured loudspeakers, and in 1992, the it entered into a partnership with Studer, developing and manufacturing the Studer A1, A3 and A5 active studio monitors as OEM products.

In 2004, following the end of the Studer partnership, Relec launched PSI Audio as its own professional monitoring brand, commercializing technologies that had previously been developed for Studer products. PSI Audio continued introducing proprietary analogue technologies, including Adaptive Output Impedance (AOI), Compensated Phase Response (CPR) and proprietary Class G/H amplifiers, which became standard across much of its product range.

In 2016 the company introduced the AVAA C20, described as the first commercially available analogue active bass trap based on acoustic absorption rather than electronic room correction. In 2023 PSI Audio released the AVAA C214, adding digital control and network connectivity. In 2025 the company introduced the A226-MAIN three-way main monitoring system.

== Technology ==
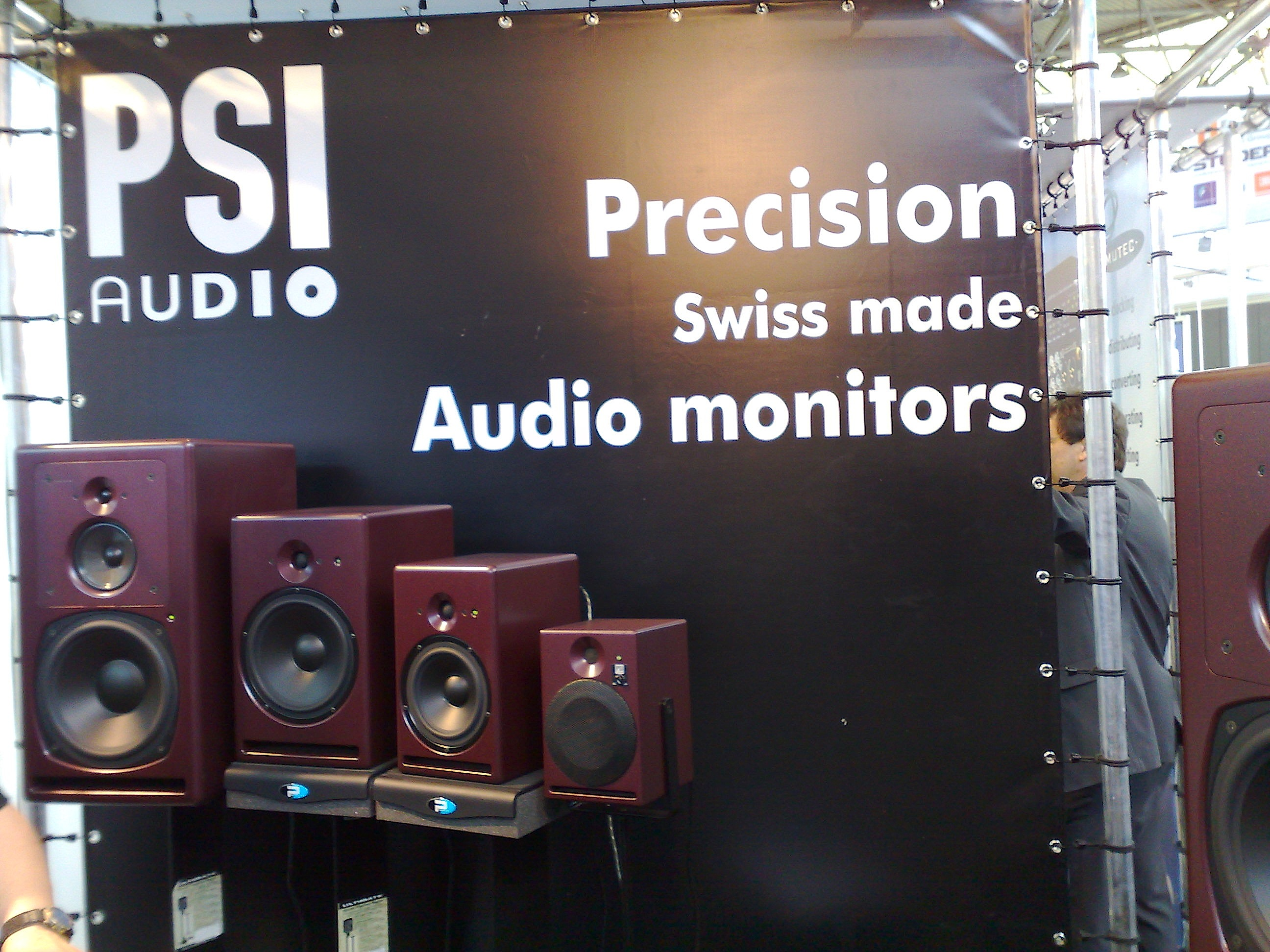
PSI AUDIO monitors

PSI Audio develops monitoring systems using analogue signal processing. According to the company, analogue circuitry avoids signal latency and eliminates additional analogue-to-digital and digital-to-analogue conversion stage. Its Compensated Phase Response (CPR) technology delays higher frequencies to align them more closely with lower frequencies, improving transient reproduction while maintaining low latency. Proprietary technologies include:

- Adaptive Output Impedance (AOI): a motion-feedback system that continuously adjusts amplifier output impedance to improve driver damping and reduce resonances.
- Compensated Phase Response (CPR): an analogue all-pass filter network designed to improve phase coherence and transient response while maintaining low latency.
- Class G/H amplification: proprietary multi-rail power amplifiers developed for higher efficiency and reduced thermal stress.
- Flow Guide: an internal bass reflex port geometry intended to reduce turbulence and resonances within ported loudspeaker cabinets.
- AVAA (Active Velocity Acoustic Absorber): an active acoustic device that absorbs low-frequency room energy without using anti-phase cancellation or conventional passive bass trapping.

Bass-reflex loudspeakers incorporate a proprietary Flow Guide, an internal structure designed to regulate airflow within the port and reduce aerodynamic noise and internal resonances.

== AVAA ==
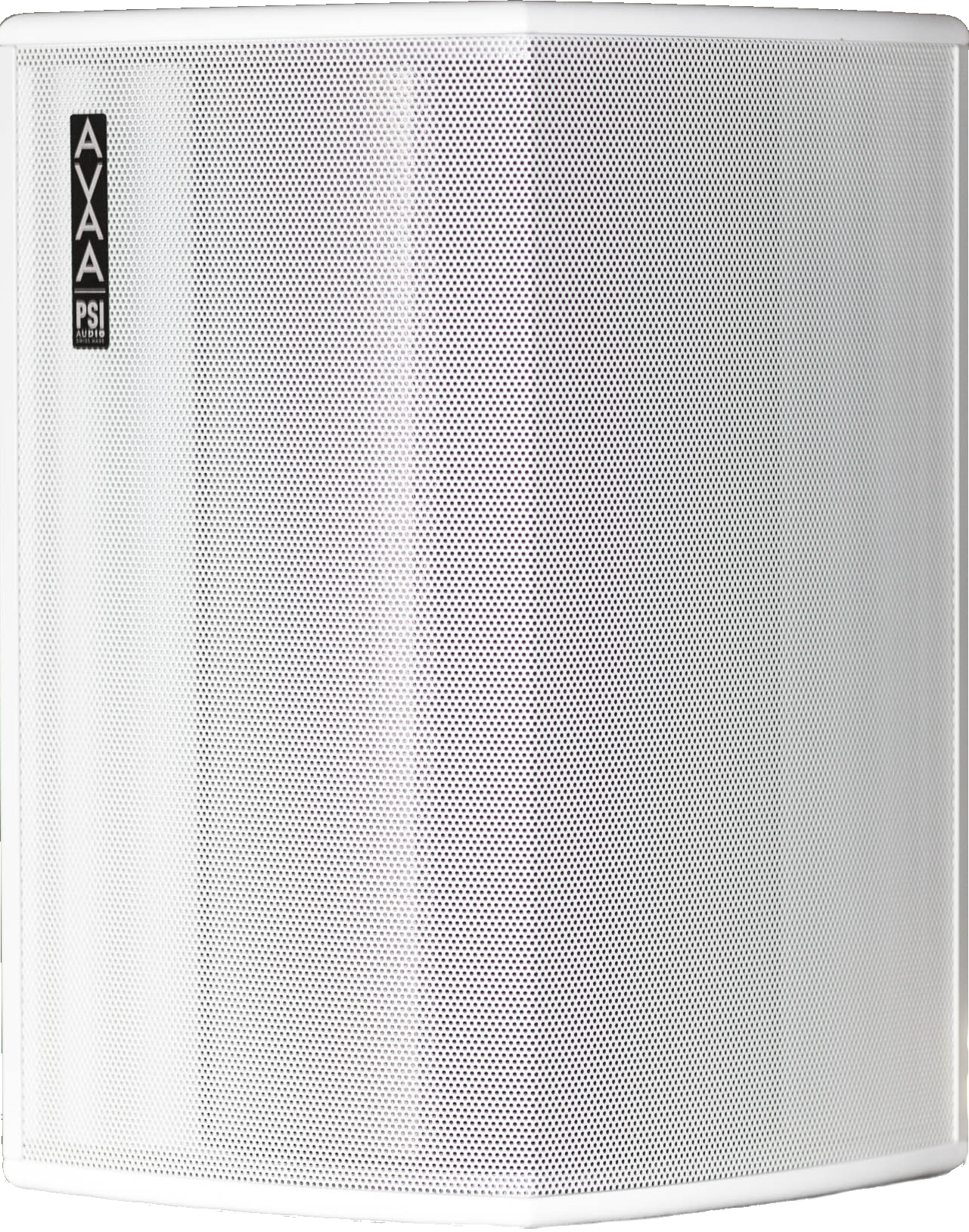
AVAA C20

The AVAA (Active Velocity Acoustic Absorber) are a unique type of active acoustic absorbers that employ analogue electronic design (AVAA C20) and digital signal processing (AVAA C214). Unlike conventional passive bass traps, AVAA units use active acoustic technology to reduce low-frequency resonances over a frequency range of approximately 15-160 Hz.

AVAA respond to pressure variations caused by room modes, designed to reduce low-frequency room modes and standing waves. It modifies the acoustic impedance at its location, allowing it to reduce standing-wave resonance without introducing an audio signal into the room. It requires no electronic calibration, instead being positioned at locations of high acoustic pressure, typically room corners. It operates by sensing pressure variations associated with standing waves and altering the acoustic impedance at its location. The device functions as an active low-frequency absorber rather than using phase cancellation or conventional porous absorption materials.

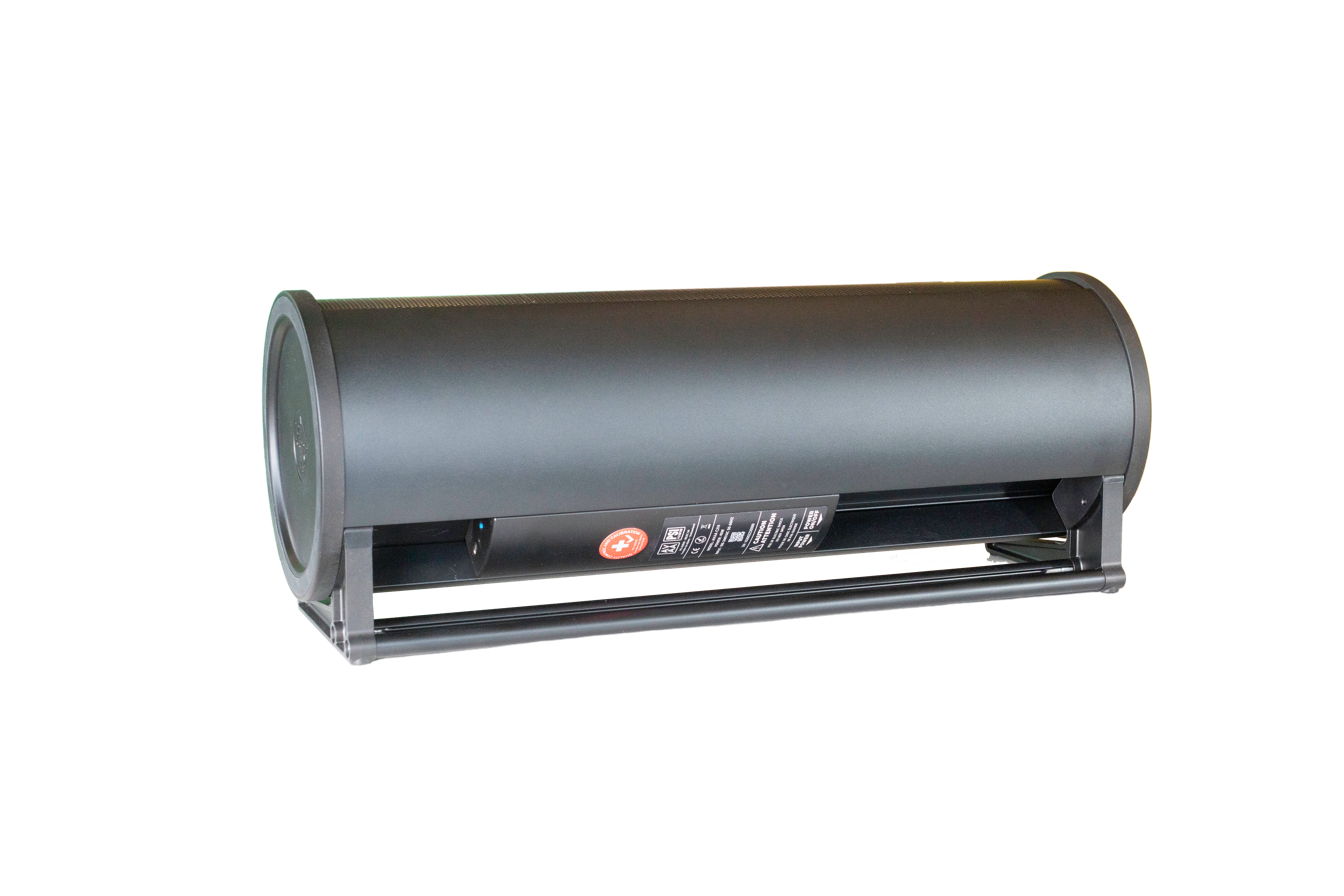
AVAA C214

The AVAA C20 was introduced in 2016. It uses an analogue electronic design that operates over a frequency range of 15–150 Hz. It is often used in recording studios, home studios, broadcast facilities, and listening rooms.

The AVAA C214 was introduced in 2023 and uses digital signal processing. Ithas a cylindrical aluminium enclosure and is controlled through a mobile application that allows adjustment of operating sensitivity. It has an operating range extending to 160 Hz.

== Products ==
PSI Audio manufactures active studio monitors, loudspeakers, and acoustic treatment systems.

Studio mointors	
A14-M Studio	compact two-way active nearfield loudspeaker.
A14-M Studio	compact two-way active nearfield loudspeaker.
A14-M Broadcast	broadcast-oriented version of the A14-M intended for radio and television applications.
A17-M	two-way active nearfield monitor.
A21-M	larger two-way active midfield monitor intended for greater listening distances.
A23-M	three-way active studio monitor. It incorporates AOI, CPR, and custom-designed drivers.
A25-M	a larger three-way active midfield monitor intended for mastering and mixing.
A215-M	compact mastering monitor.
A214-M	dedicated centre-channel loudspeaker designed for surround and immersive audio systems.
A226-MAIN	three-way main monitoring system.
A326 D-REX	dynamic range extender.
Sub A125-M	compact active subwoofer.
Sub A225-M	higher-output full-range subwoofer.

Bass traps	
AVAA C20	the device operates over approximately 15–150 Hz and was designed to reduce standing waves and room resonances.
AVAA C214	second-generation active bass trap that extends the operating range to approximately 15–160 Hz.

== Gallery ==
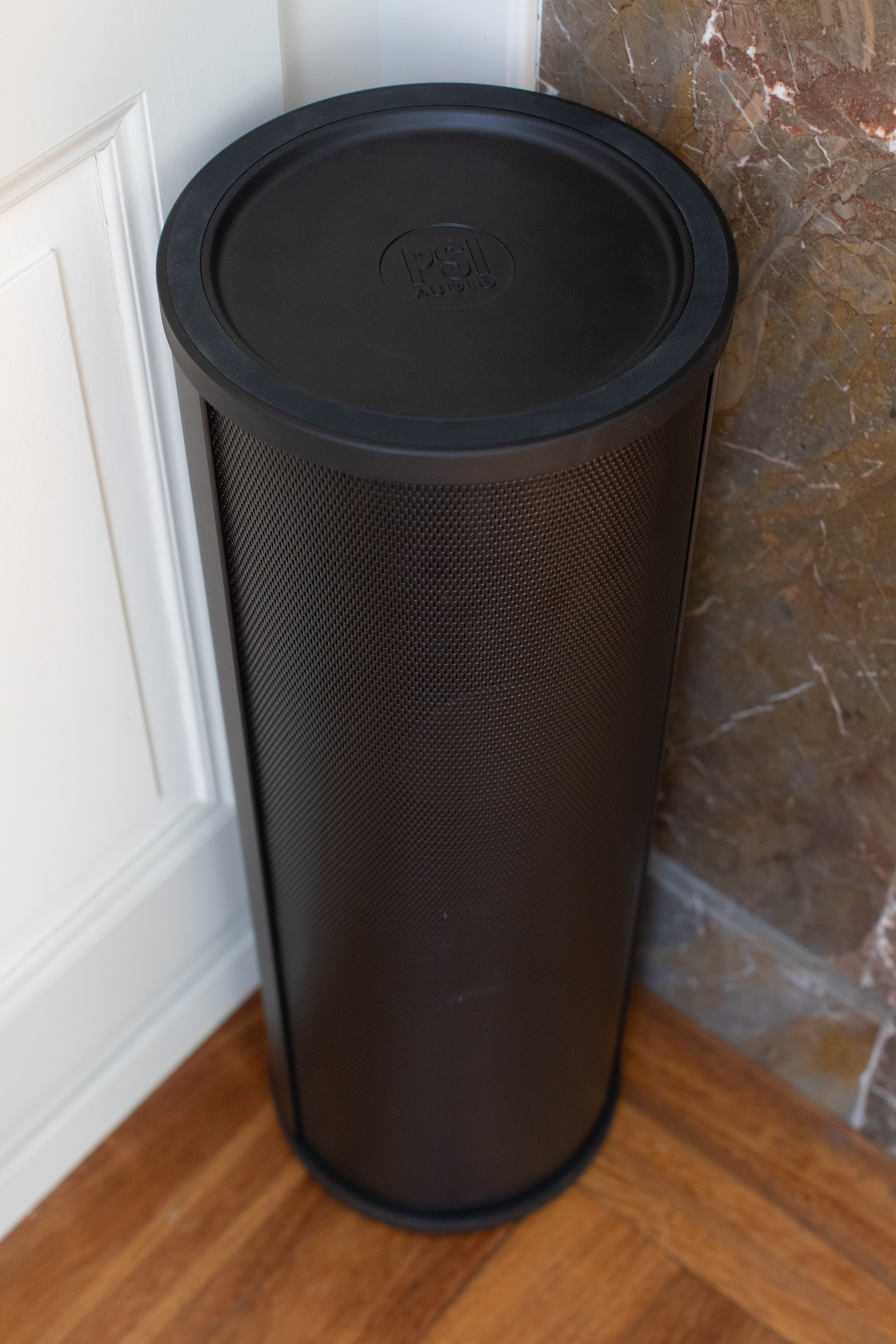
AVAA C214

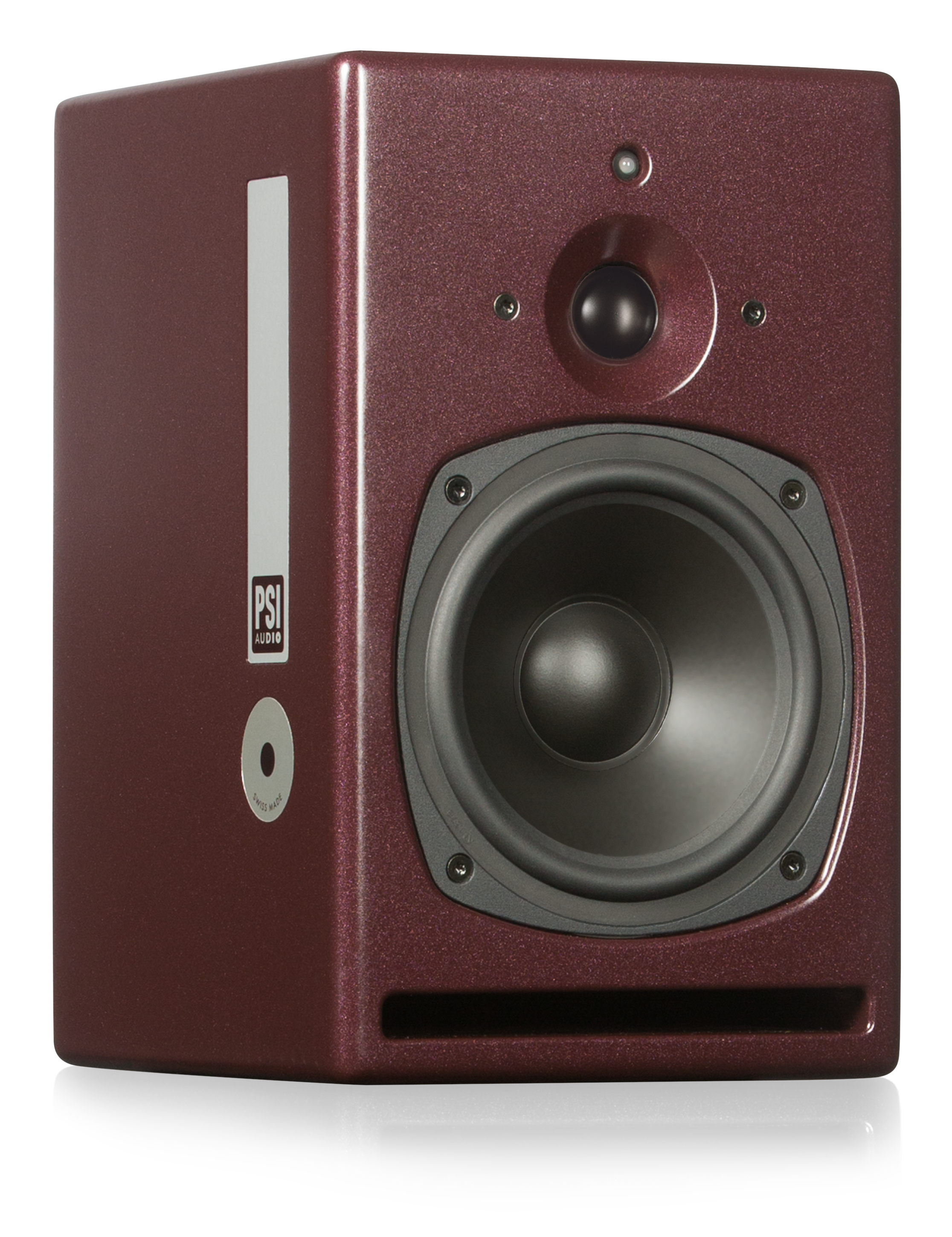
A17-M

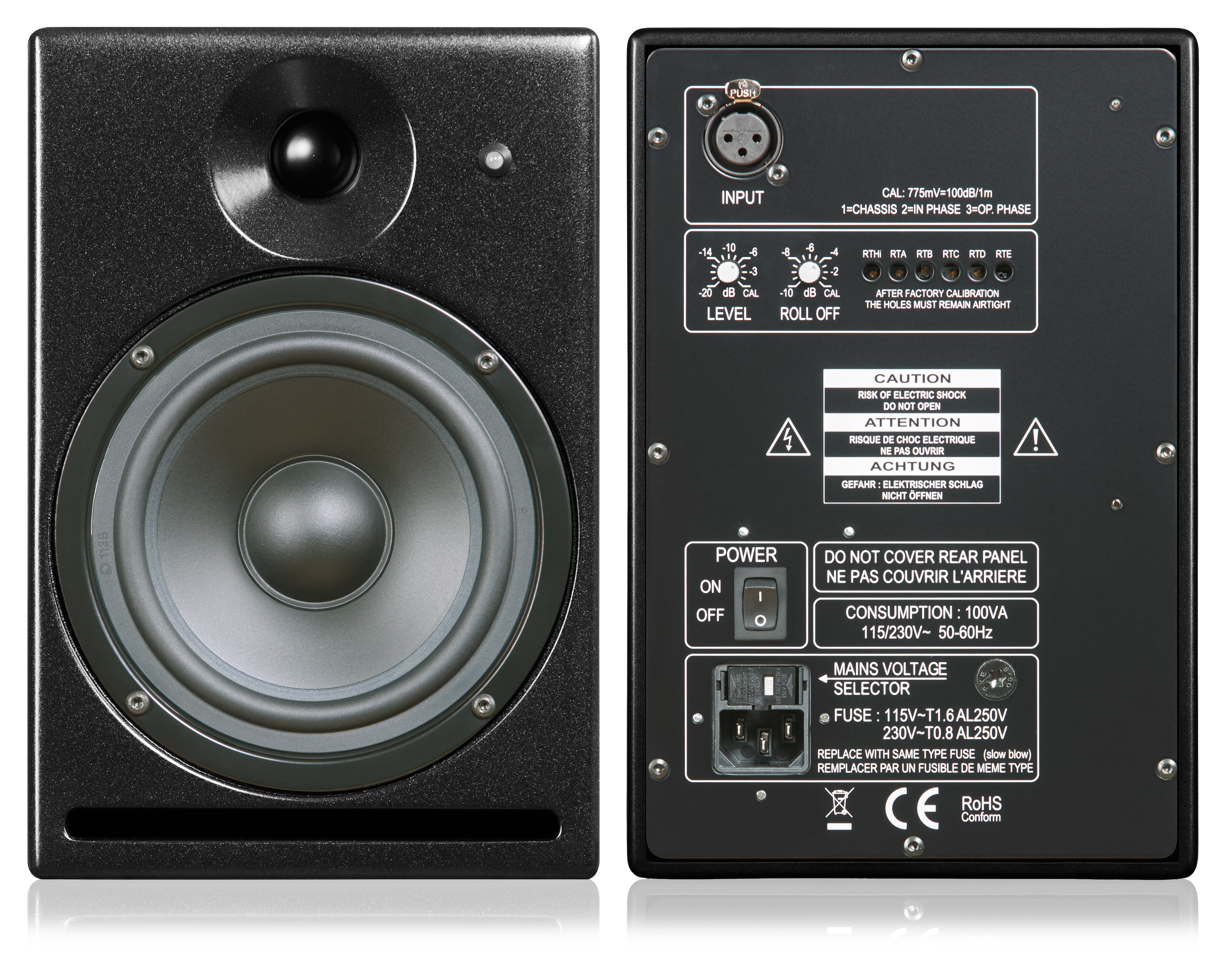
A14-M

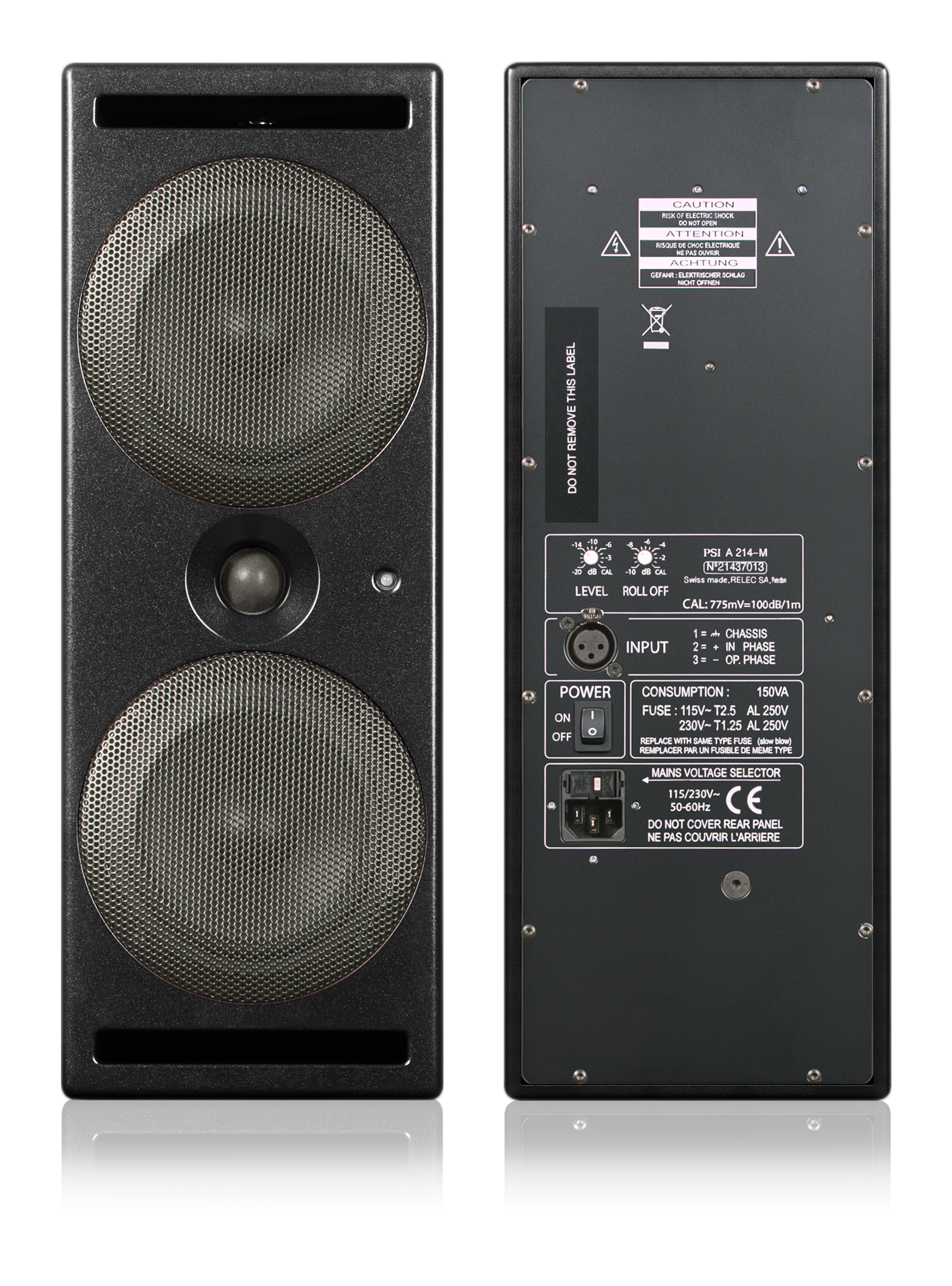
A214-M

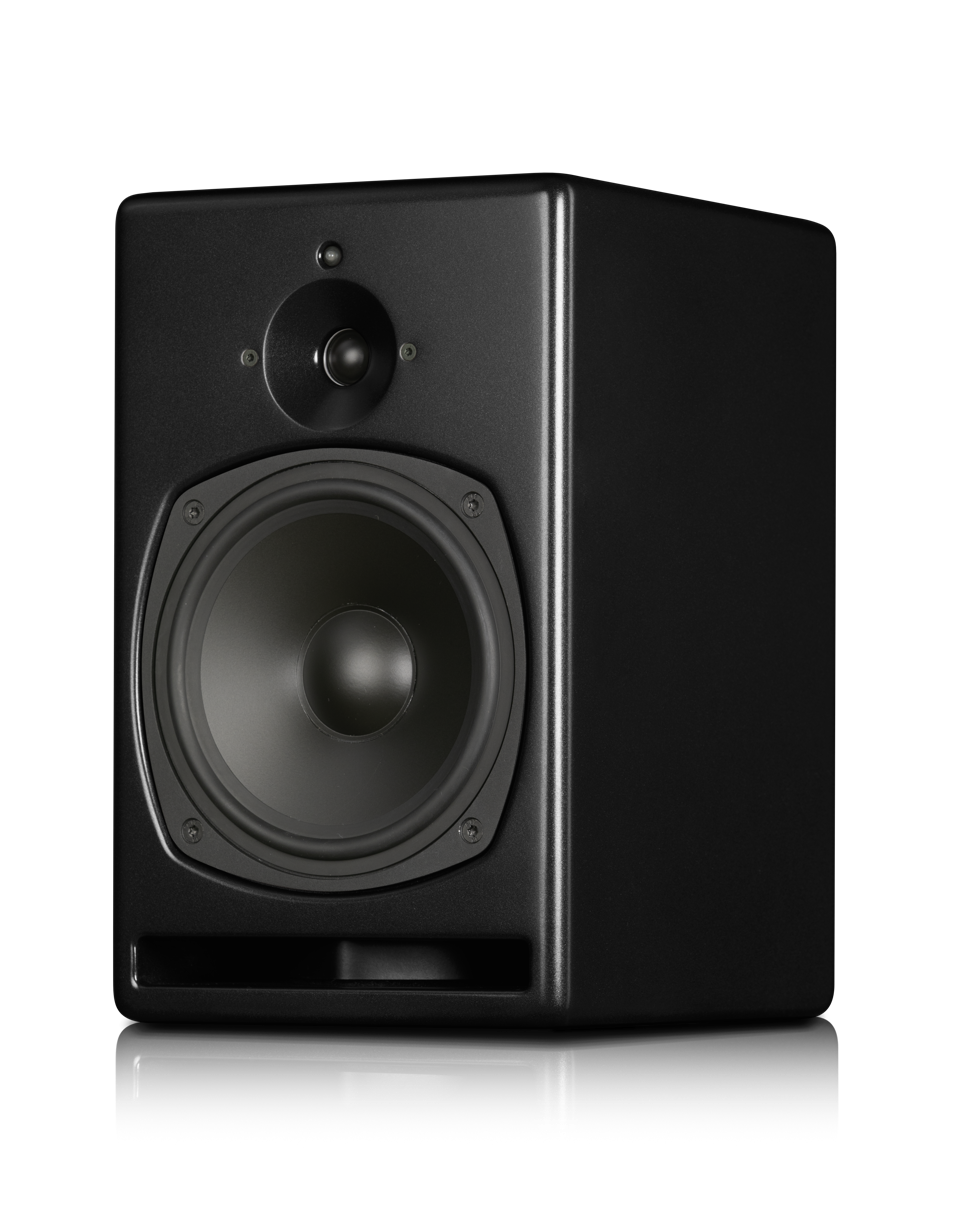
A21-M

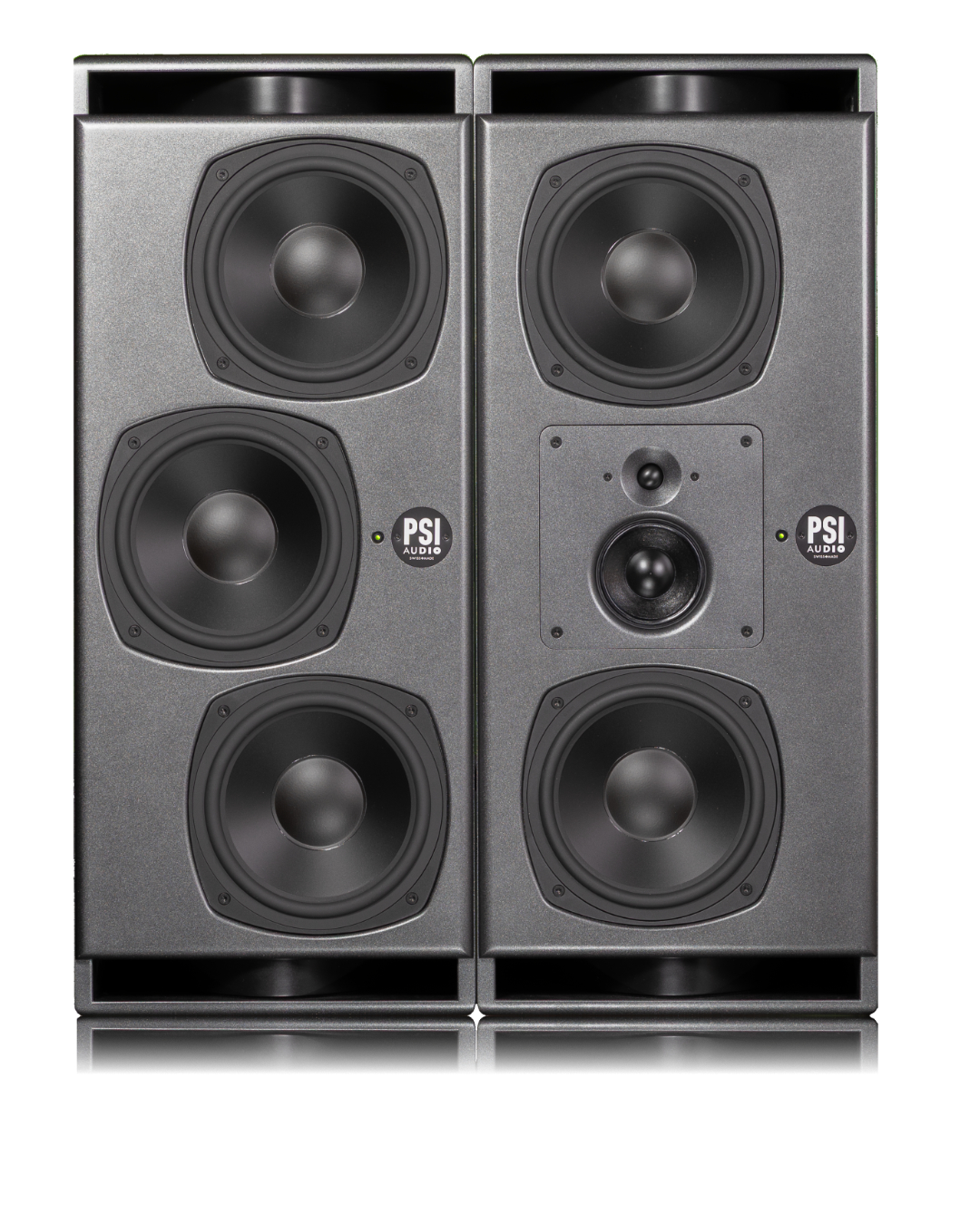
A226-M and A326-M

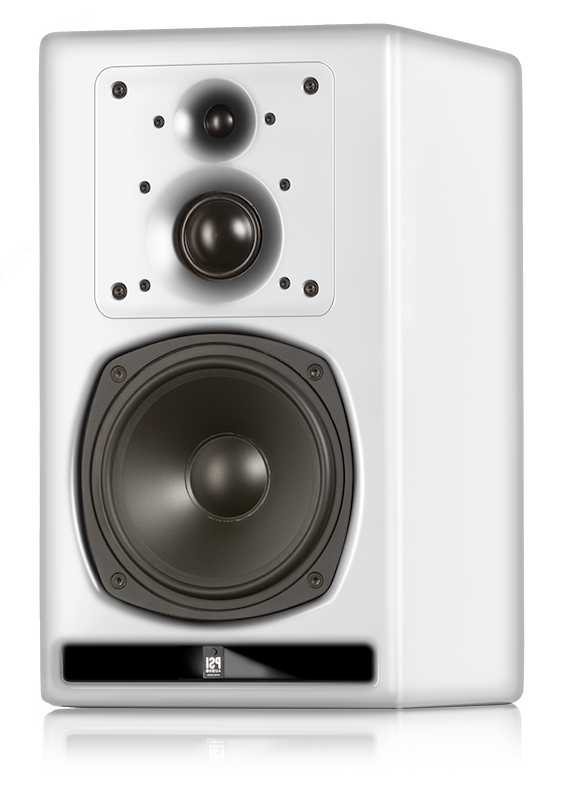
A23-M

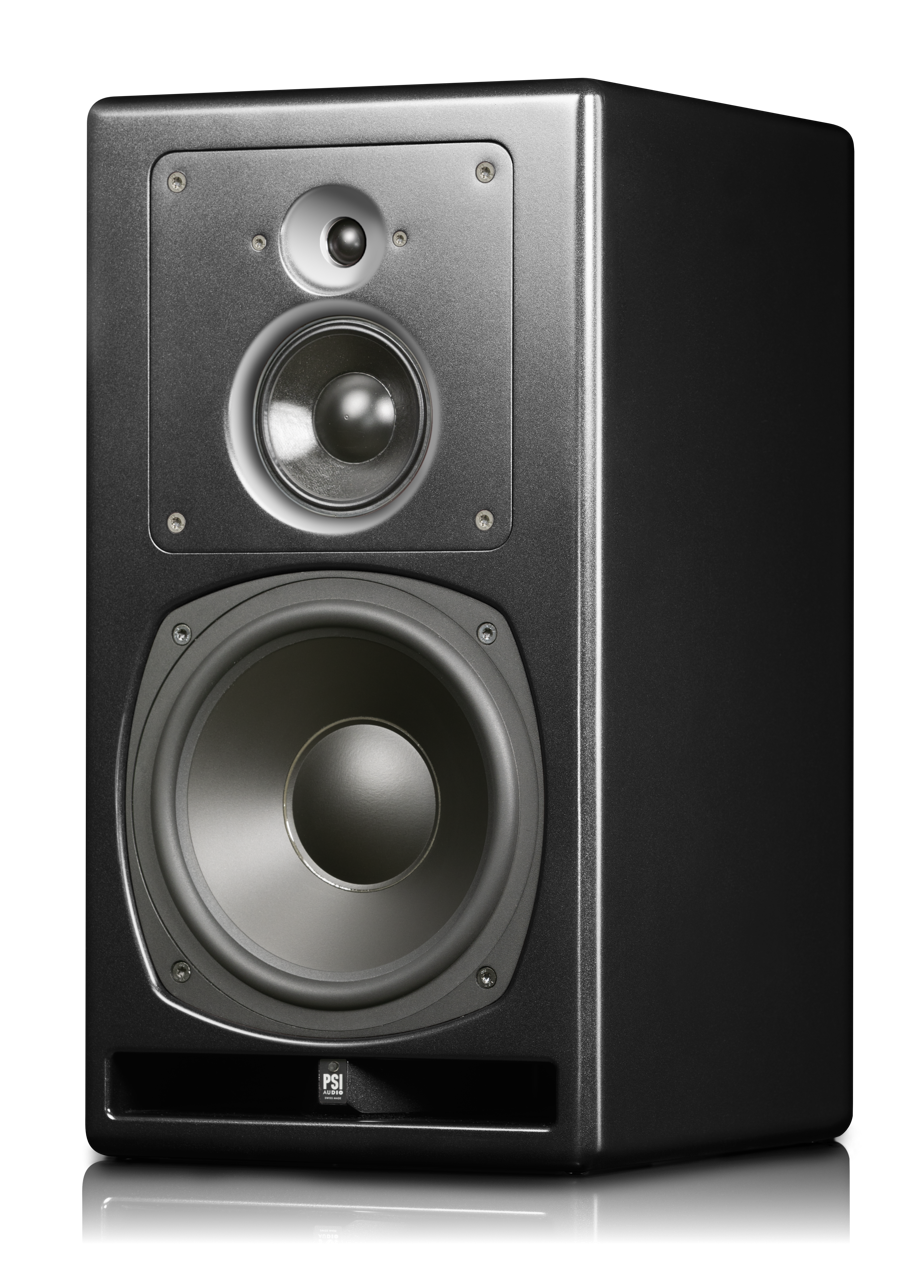
A25-Ms2

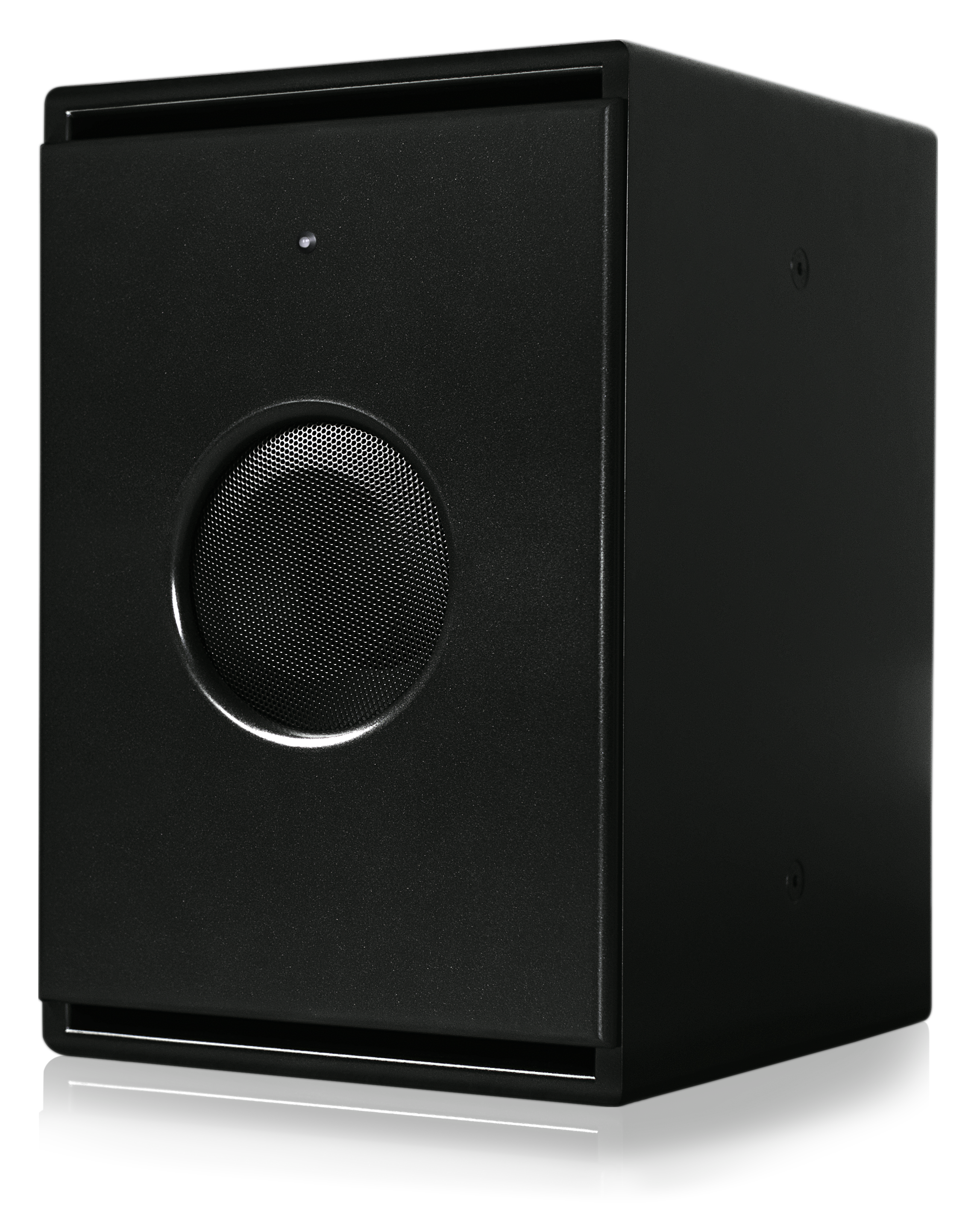
A125-M

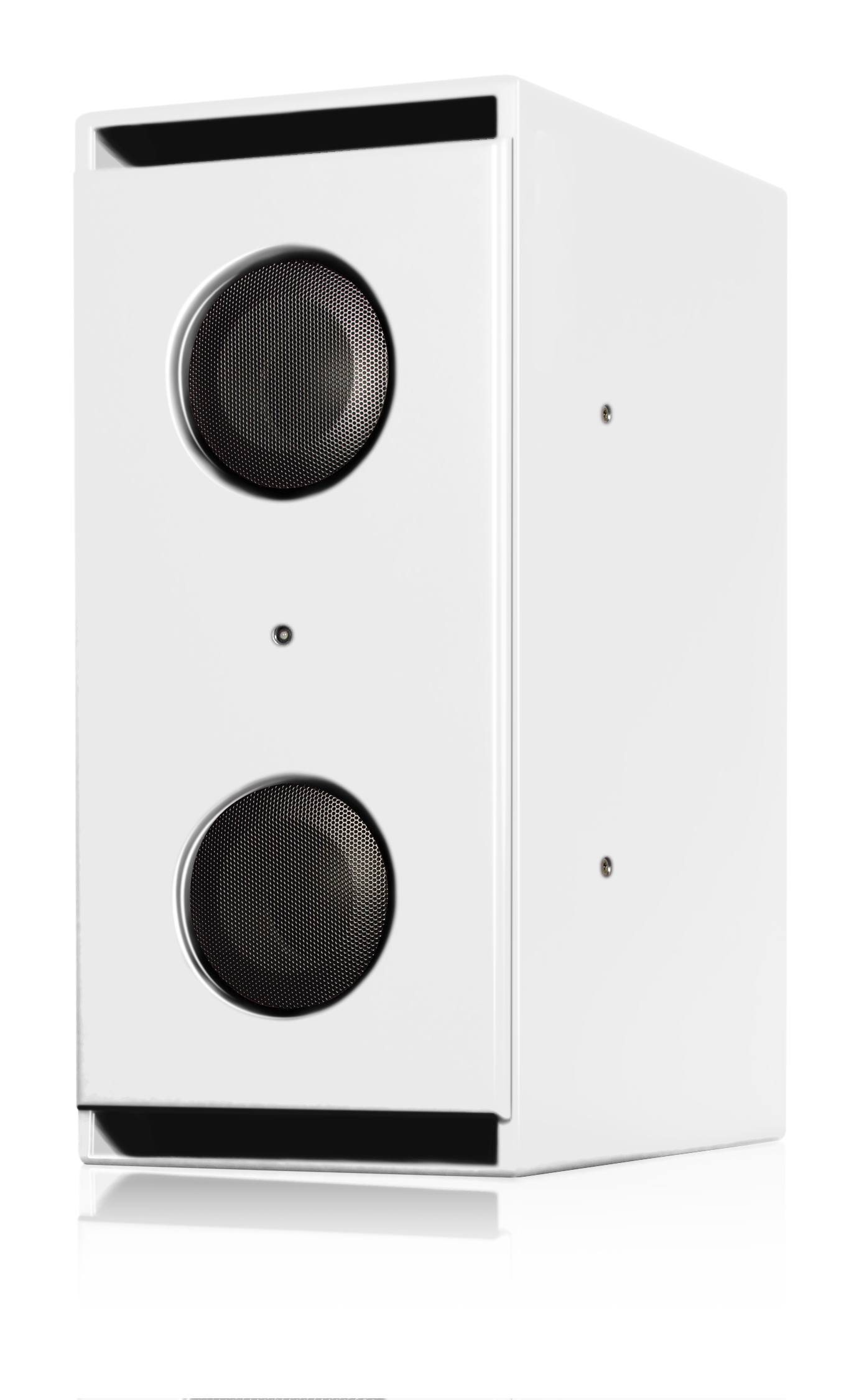
A225-M active subwoofer

== See also ==
- List of studio monitor manufacturers
