= Digital sensor =

Type of electronic or electrochemical sensor

A digital sensor is an electronic or electrochemical sensor, where data is digitally converted and transmitted. Sensors are often used for analytical measurements, e.g. the measurement of chemical and physical properties of liquids. Examples of measured parameters are pH value, conductivity, oxygen, redox potentials. Such measurements are used in the industrialized world and give vital input for process control.

Analog sensors were used in the past, but digital sensors have come to dominate in the age of microprocessors. The differences between the two types, and the reasons for the development of digital sensors are discussed:

== General aspects ==
Digital sensors are the modern successors of analog sensors. Digital sensors replace analog sensors stepwise, because they overcome the traditional drawbacks of analog sensor systems (cf chapter 3 –which book?)

== History ==
Electronic and electrochemical sensors are typically one part of a measuring chain. A measuring chain comprises the sensor itself, a cable, and a transmitter. In the traditional analog systems, the sensor converts the measuring parameter (e.g. pH value) into an analog electrical signal. This analog electrical signal is connected to a transmitter via a cable. The transmitter transforms the electrical signal into a readable form (display, current outputs, bus data transmission, etc.).

The sensor and the cable often are not connected permanently, but through electrical connectors. This classical design with connectors and transmission of small currents through a cable has four main drawbacks:

1) Humidity and corrosion of the connector falsify the signal.

2) The cable must be shielded and of very high quality to prevent the measuring signal from being altered by electromagnetic noise.

3) The sensor cannot be calibrated or adjusted until installation, because the influence of the cable (length, resistance, impedance) cannot be neglected.

4) The cable length is limited.

== Use and design ==
Digital sensors have been developed to overcome the traditional disadvantages of analog sensors. Digital sensors are widely used in water and industrial processes. They measure parameters such as pH, redox potential, conductivity, dissolved oxygen, ammonium, nitrate, SAC, turbidity. A digital sensor system consists of the sensor itself, a cable, and a transmitter. The differences with analog sensor systems are:

a) The sensor has an electronic chip. The measuring signal is directly converted into a digital signal inside the sensor. The data transmission through the cable is also digital. This digital data transmission is unaffected by cable length, cable resistance or impedance, and is not influenced by electromagnetic noise. Standard cables can be used.

b) The connection between sensor and cable can be contactless and done by inductive coupling. Humidity and related corrosion is no longer an issue. Alternative fibre-optic cables may also be an option for long or electromagnetically hostile connections

c) The sensor can be calibrated apart from the system.

== See also ==
- Image sensor
