= Room modes =

Resonating sound wave in a closed room

Room modes are the collection of resonances that exist in a room when the room is excited by an acoustic source such as a loudspeaker. Most rooms have their fundamental resonances in the 20 Hz to 200 Hz region, each frequency being related to one or more of the room's dimensions or a divisor thereof. These resonances affect the low-frequency low-mid-frequency response of a sound system in the room and are one of the biggest obstacles to accurate sound reproduction.

Discrete room modes dominate only at low frequencies. Above a transition known as the Schroeder frequency, the modes overlap so densely that the room response is better treated statistically than as a set of separated resonances. This frequency is commonly approximated by $f \approx 2000\sqrt{T/V}$, where T is the reverberation time in seconds and V is the room volume in cubic metres; for typical rooms it falls in the low hundreds of hertz.

== Mechanism of room resonances ==
Room modes between two hard walls. There must always be a sound pressure antinode at the walls.

The input of acoustic energy to the room at the modal frequencies and multiples thereof causes standing waves. The nodes and antinodes of these standing waves result in the loudness of the particular resonant frequency being different at different locations of the room. These standing waves can be considered a temporary storage of acoustic energy as they take a finite time to build up and a finite time to dissipate once the sound energy source has been removed.

=== Calculating modal frequencies ===
For a rectangular room with rigid walls, the natural (modal) frequencies are given by

$f_{l,m,n} = \frac{c}{2}\sqrt{\left(\frac{l}{L_x}\right)^2 + \left(\frac{m}{L_y}\right)^2 + \left(\frac{n}{L_z}\right)^2}$

where c is the speed of sound, L_{x}, L_{y} and L_{z} are the room dimensions, and l, m and n are non-negative integers (not all zero) that identify the mode. Modes are classified by how many of these integers are non-zero: axial modes involve one pair of opposite surfaces (one non-zero index), tangential modes involve two pairs (two non-zero indices), and oblique modes involve all three pairs (three non-zero indices). Axial modes generally carry the most energy and have the greatest influence on the low-frequency response of a room.

== Minimizing effect of room resonances ==
A room with generally hard surfaces will exhibit high-Q, sharply tuned resonances. Absorbent material can be added to the room to damp such resonances, which work by dissipating the stored acoustic energy more quickly.

In order to be effective, a layer of porous, absorbent material has to be of the order of a quarter-wavelength thick if placed on a wall, which at low frequencies with their long wavelengths requires very thick absorbers. Absorption occurs through friction of the air motion against individual fibres, with kinetic energy converted to heat, and so the material must be of just the right "density" in terms of fibre packing. Too loose, and sound will pass through, but too firm, and reflection will occur. Technically it is a matter of impedance matching between air motion and the individual fibres. Glass fibre, as used for thermal insulation, is very effective, but needs to be very thick (perhaps 4–6 in; 100–150 mm) if the result is not to be a room that sounds unnaturally "dead" at high frequencies but remains "boomy" at lower frequencies, so that it provides absorption across a broad range of frequencies. Curtains and carpets are only effective at high frequencies (say, 5 kHz and above).

As a rule of thumb, sound travels at one foot per millisecond (344 m/s), so the wavelength of notes at 1 kHz is about a foot (344 mm), and at 10 kHz about an inch (34 mm). Even 6 in (150 mm) of glass fibre has little effect at 100 Hz, where a quarter wavelength is over 2 feet (860 mm), and so adding absorbent material has virtually no effect in the lower bass region in the 20–50 Hz region, though it can bring about great improvement in the upper bass region above 100 Hz.

Open apertures, dispersion cylinders (large diameter and usually wall height), carefully sized and placed panels, and irregular room shapes are another way of either absorbing energy or breaking up resonant modes. For absorption, as with large foam wedges seen in anechoic chambers, the loss occurs ultimately through turbulence, as colliding air molecules convert some of their kinetic energy into heat. Damped panels, typically consisting of sheets of hardboard between glass fibre battens, have been used to absorb bass, by allowing movement of the surface panel and energy absorption by friction with the fibre battens.

If a room is being constructed, it is possible to choose room dimensions for which its resonances are less audible. This is done by ensuring that multiple room resonances are not at similar frequencies. For example, a cubic room would exhibit three resonances at the same frequency.

Equalisation of the sound system to compensate for the uneven frequency response caused by room resonances is of very limited use as the equalisation only works for one specific listening position and will actually cause the response to be worse in other listening positions. Also large bass boosts by sound system EQ can severely reduce the headroom in the sound system itself. Some vendors are currently providing elaborate room-tuning equipment, which requires precision microphones, extensive data collection, and uses computerised electronic filtering to implement the necessary compensation for the rooms modes. There is some controversy about the relative worth of the improvement in ordinary rooms, given the very high cost of these systems.

== Concert halls ==
Very large rooms like concert halls or large television studios have fundamental resonances which are much lower in frequency than small rooms. This means the closely spaced harmonic resonances are likely to lie in the low frequency region and thus the response tends to be more uniform.

== See also ==
- Loudspeaker measurement
