= Bookshelf speaker =

Loudspeaker for home audio

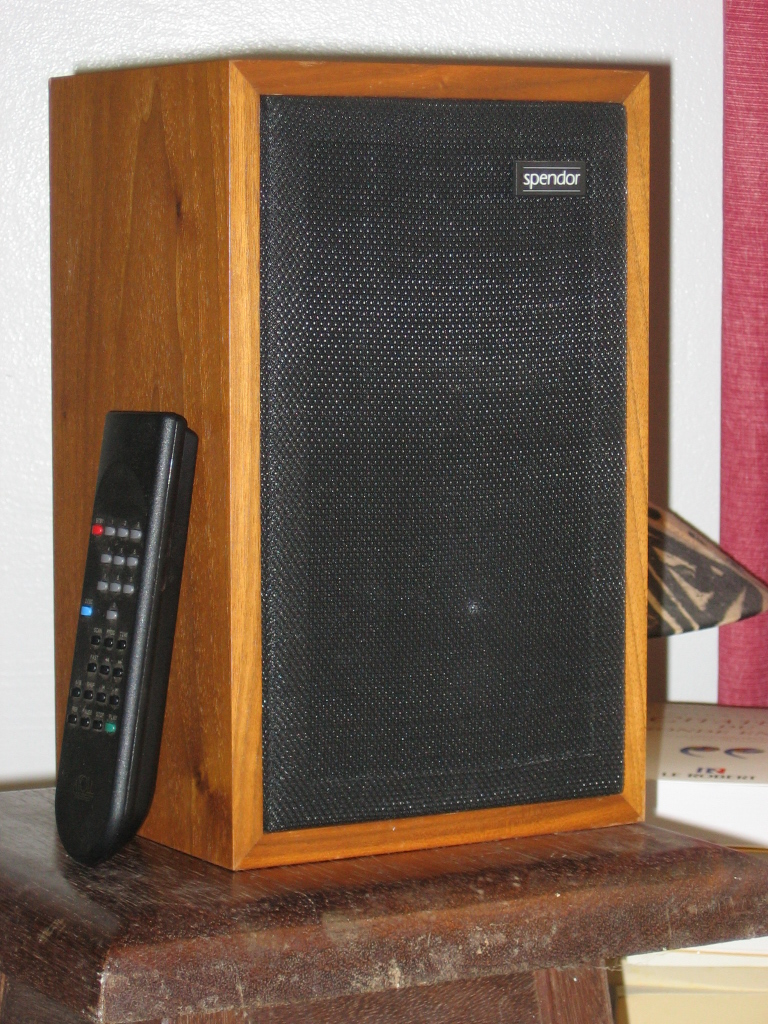
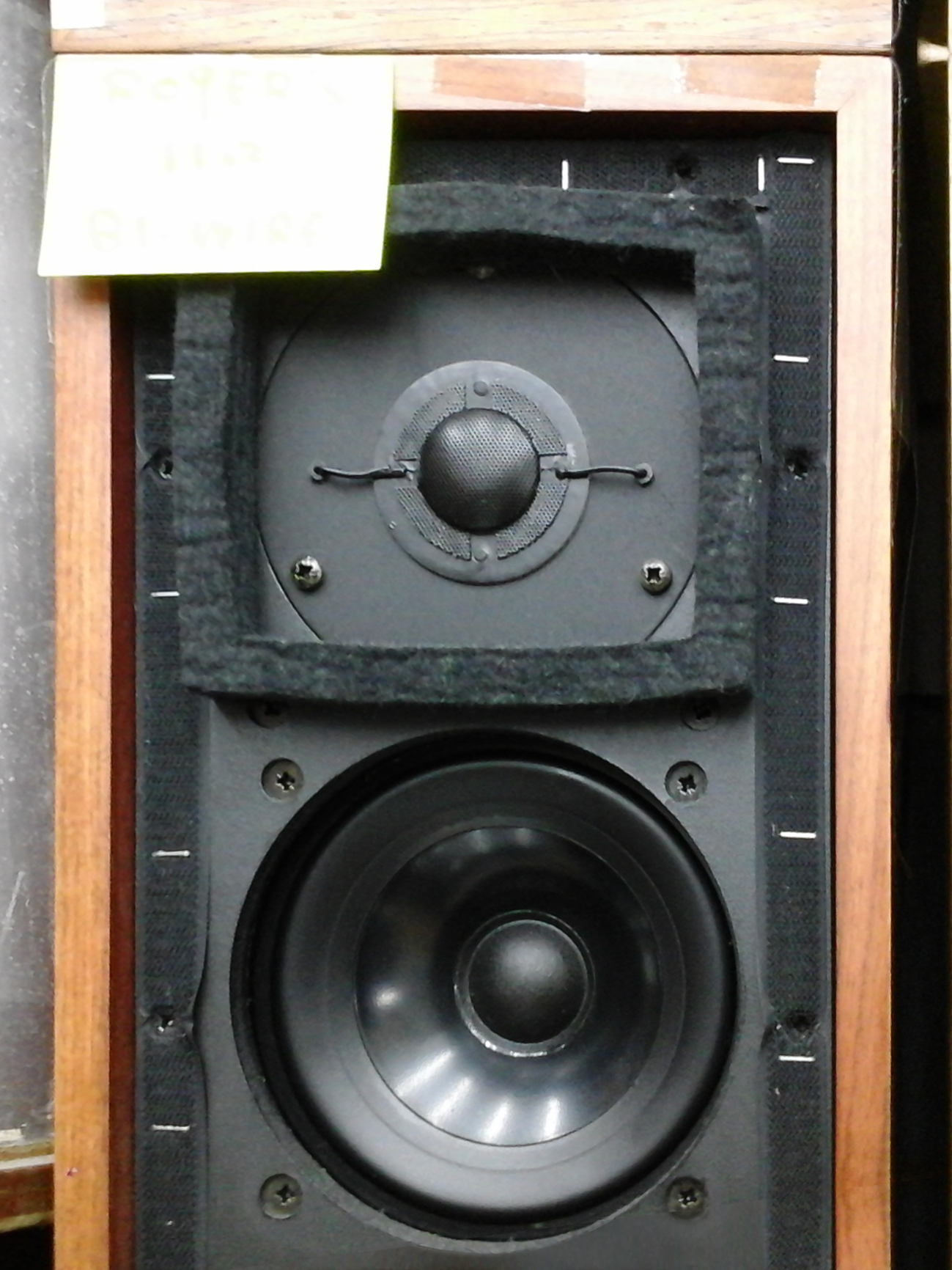
LS3/5A (1975–2003) from Spendor (left) and Rogers (right, without grill),
designed for BBC by Spencer Hughes and Dudley Harwood using KEF units, and first manufactured in 1975.

A bookshelf loudspeaker (or bookshelf speaker) is a compact loudspeaker, generally sold for consumer-grade home audio applications as part of a shelf stereo pair or home theater package, that is compact in size and intended to be placed on a raised surface, e.g. a bookshelf.

== History ==
In the 1950s and 1960s, high quality home loudspeakers were exclusively large and floor-standing speaker enclosures, whereas small speaker cabinets had reputation of low price and low audio quality. Beginning in the 1960s, some manufacturers began making more expensive, compact high fidelity speakers. The demand for smaller speakers was from hifi enthusiasts who lived in small apartments, who did not have space for large speaker enclosures.

Edgar Villchur, who along with partner Henry Kloss founded Acoustic Research, is generally credited with inventing bookshelf speakers. Villchur's key innovation was an acoustic suspension (also called "sealed box") design, by which the woofer and other drivers were in separately enclosed chambers. The speaker drivers were stiffer and much smaller than the earlier ported designs. The acoustic suspension design enabled the air in the sealed box to act like a spring, to help prevent excessive excursion. Advent, now defunct, was another early manufacturer of bookshelf speakers.

Certain market and technical issues have contributed to the widespread adoption of bookshelf speakers in the 1990s and beyond. Technical improvements and less expensive mass-production technologies have made high-quality bookshelf speakers affordable for most audio enthusiasts. Rapid improvements in amplifiers, digital signal processors and other components has improved the sound quality of low to mid-level home audio systems, which creates a stronger need for adequate speakers.

Home theater systems are increasingly popular, and their multi-channel audio requires five or more speakers rather than the two speakers of earlier stereo systems. For cost and practical reasons the most common setup is satellite speakers, typically bookshelf speakers for the side, back, and sometimes the front and center channels, rather than larger speakers for each channel.

Finally, most home theater and many musical home audio applications, began in the late 1990s to incorporate separately-enclosed subwoofers to handle deep bass. Human perception of low-frequency sound is relatively non-directional, so a single subwoofer cabinet placed anywhere in the room (even hidden behind a sofa) is usually sufficient and may be placed anywhere. This frees up the other speakers to omit the lower end of the frequency spectrum. Without the relatively heavy, bulky, and expensive low bass drivers and their large speaker enclosures, the speakers can be made smaller.

== See also ==
- ADAM Audio
