= Computer speakers =

Type of speakers sold for use with computers

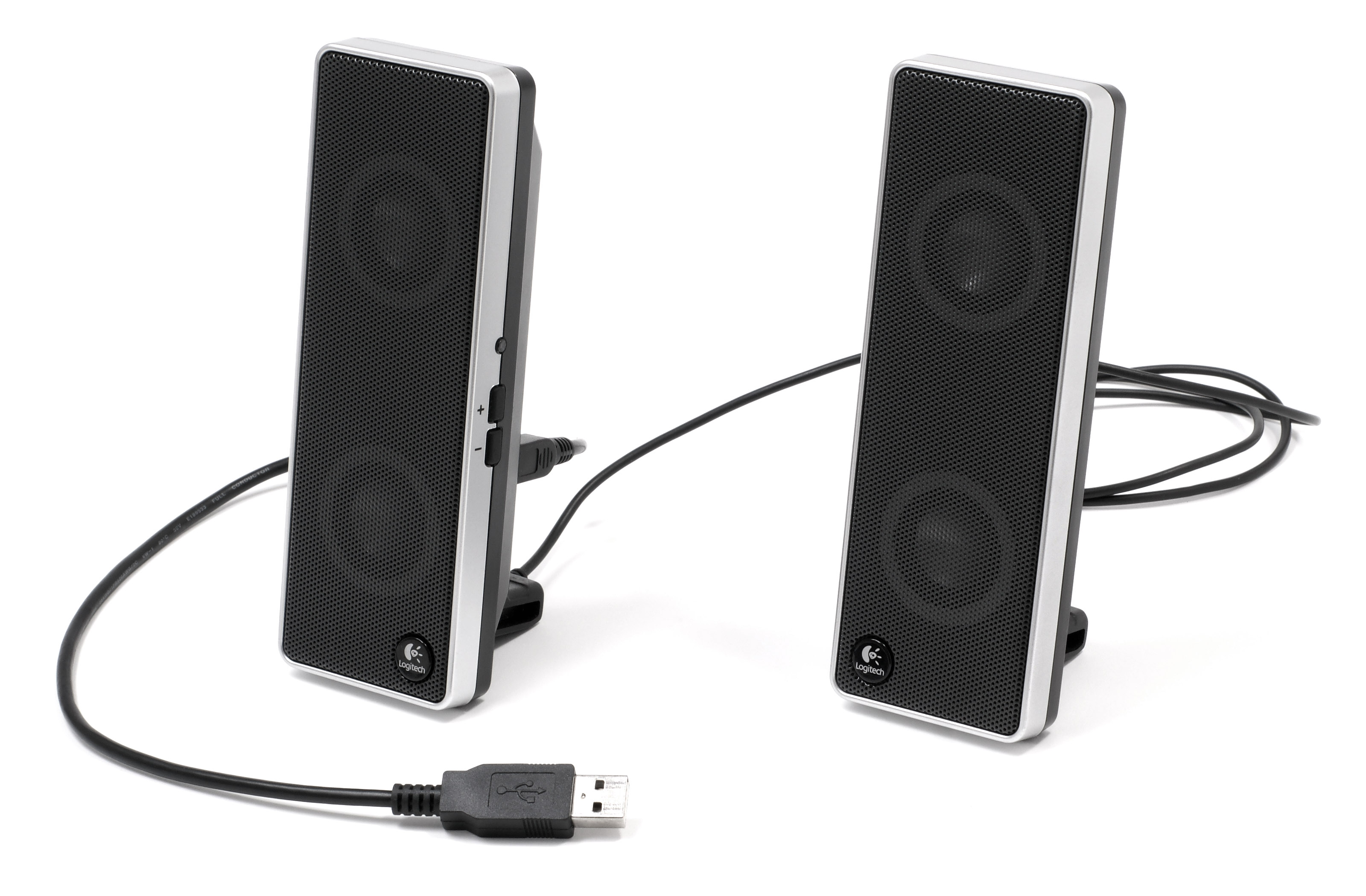
A pair of external speakers for notebook computers that are powered and audio-connected to the computer via USB

Computer speakers, or multimedia speakers, are speakers marketed for use with computers, although usually capable of other audio uses, e.g. for a shelf stereo or television. Most such speakers have an internal amplifier and consequently require a power source, which may be by a mains power supply often via an AC adapter, batteries, or a USB port. The signal input connector is often an analog 3.5 mm jack plug (usually color-coded lime green per the PC 99 standard); RCA connectors are sometimes used, and a USB port or Bluetooth antenna may supply a digital signal to an onboard DAC (some of which work only on computers with an appropriate device driver). Battery-powered wireless speakers require no cables at all. Most computers have speakers of low power and quality built in; when external speakers are connected they disable the built-in speakers by default. Altec Lansing claims to have created the computer speaker market in 1990.

Computer speakers range widely in quality and in price. Computer speakers packaged with computer systems are typically small, plastic, and have mediocre sound quality. Some computer speakers have equalization features such as bass and treble controls. More sophisticated computer speakers can have a subwoofer unit to enhance bass output. The larger subwoofer enclosure usually contains the amplifiers for the subwoofer and the left and right speakers.

Some discrete computer displays have rather basic integrated speakers, or accommodations for mounting matching satellite speakers or a soundbar externally. Laptop computers have built-in integrated speakers, usually small and of restricted sound quality to conserve space.

== See also ==
- PC speaker
- Loudspeaker enclosure
- Bookshelf speaker
