= Harbeth Audio Limited =

British loudspeaker manufacturer

Harbeth Audio Limited is a British manufacturer of high-fidelity loudspeakers based in Lindfield, West Sussex, England. The company was founded in 1977 by Dudley Harwood, who was previously a Senior Engineer in the British Broadcasting Corporation (BBC) Research Department.

== History ==
Harwood founded the company to commercialize his patent for the polypropylene speaker cone, which he had pioneered while working at the BBC audio acoustics laboratory. The company's name is a portmanteau of his own surname and his wife's first name, Elizabeth.

Upon retiring from the BBC, Hardwood launched the HL Monitor 1977. It utilised patented polypropylene for the speaker driver.

Harbeth was one of a number of British manufacturing firms officially licensed by the BBC to manufacture the legendary LS3/5A studio monitor. In 1986, Harwood sold the company to Alan Shaw, who has since overseen the development of proprietary driver technologies such as the "RADIAL" synthetic polymer cone.

Notably, of the eleven companies which manufactured the BBC LS3/5A both the Harbeth and Spendor companies were both founded by ex-BBC engineers involved in the original design.
