= Harbeth =

Harbeth may refer to:

- Harbeth Audio Limited, a British loudspeaker company
- Harbeth Fu, former Hong Kong swimmer
