= Yamaha NS-10 =

Model of Yamaha studio reference loudspeakers

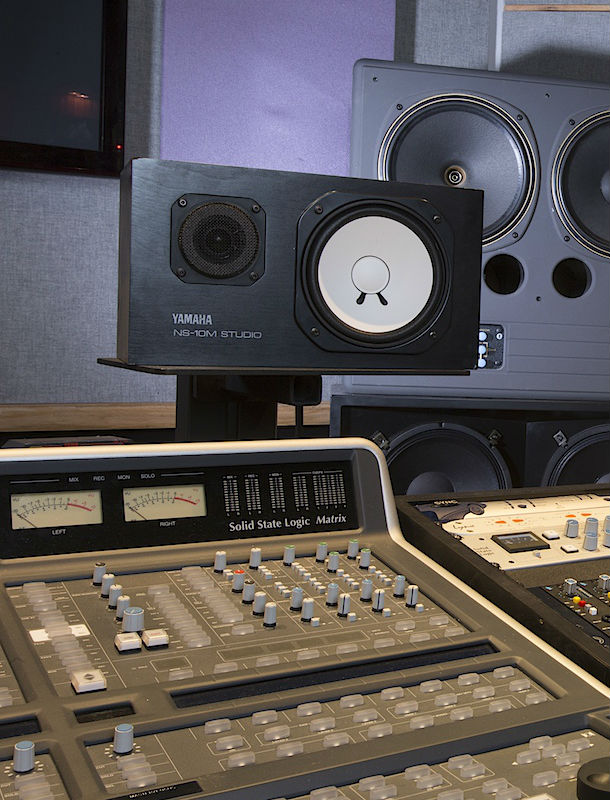
The Yamaha NS-10M studio monitor, identifiable by its horizontal lettering and white-coloured mid–bass drive unit

The Yamaha NS-10 is a loudspeaker that became a standard nearfield studio monitor in the music industry among rock and pop recording engineers. Launched by Yamaha in 1978, the NS-10 was intended as a hi-fi bookshelf speaker for domestic environments. It was received poorly by its intended audience, but became a staple for recording studios and freelance audio engineers due to its perceived ability to reveal poor quality in recordings.

The speaker is known for its exaggerated treble response, which some engineers, such as Bob Clearmountain, sought to dull by hanging tissue paper in front of its tweeter. The NS-10 has been used to monitor a large number of successful recordings by numerous artists, leading Gizmodo to refer to it as "the most important speaker you've never heard of".

== History ==
Originally conceived as a domestic hi-fi speaker, the NS-10 was designed by Akira Nakamura and launched in 1978. While the speaker was poorly received, recording engineers came to rely on the NS-10 as a benchmark. The model was discontinued in 2001.

The NS-10 was recognised for its ability to reveal shortcomings in recordings. It probably first reached American shores through a recording engineer's visit to Japan. The engineer, likely to have been Greg Ladanyi, monitored a recording session through the speaker in a Japanese studio and brought a pair back on his return to the US. Ladanyi then began using the speakers in a Los Angeles studio. Other engineers heard the NS-10 for the first time and were impressed by its sound. Its use spread to New York where the NS-10 was adopted at The Power Station and other studios.

Early use of the NS-10 among engineers include Bob Clearmountain, Rhett Davies, and Bill Scheniman in the US, and Nigel Jopson in the UK. Clearmountain, then a rising star in record production, is often credited for the popularity of the NS-10; Phil Ward, writing in Sound on Sound, suggested that Clearmountain was probably not the earliest, but was certainly the most influential early adopter. It became a legend that Clearmountain had chosen it because it was the worst speaker he could find. He was one of a new breed of creative freelance recording engineers and producers who would travel from studio to studio equipped with their own gear that included microphones, and a pair of Yamaha NS-10, as a reference.

Recording studios around the world, particularly those specialising in rock and pop music, adopted the speaker as the standard. In excess of 200,000 pairs were sold throughout the world. Gizmodo referred to it as "the most important speaker you've never heard of".

Yamaha stopped manufacturing the speaker in 2001, citing problems sourcing the wood pulp for the drivers. (Note: Ward expressed scepticism of Yamaha's stated reason for discontinuing the NS-10, noting that the shape and construction of the driver was responsible for its sound, not the specific type of wood pulp. Ward speculated that the real reason may have been market demand for speakers with more bass response.) Even years after it was discontinued, the speaker continued to be found in studios everywhere. Mix reported in 2008 that variants of the NS-10 were still commercially available in the Japanese consumer market.

== Design and construction ==
The NS-10 is an 8-ohm two-way loudspeaker with a 10.4-litre sealed cabinet measuring 382 × 215 × 199 millimetres (15.0 × 8.5 × 7.8 in) and weighing 6 kilograms (13.2 lb). Its 2.5 cm (0.98 in) particle-board cabinet has a wood veneer skin with seven black finishing layers. The domestic version of the speaker was vertically oriented, and came factory fitted with a grille.

Its two drivers are a 180 mm paper woofer and a 35 mm soft-domed tweeter. The woofer's diaphragm, weighing 3.7 g, is manufactured from a flat sheet of pressed pulp paper. Unconventionally, it is formed into conical shape not through moulding or pressure, but by curling and then gluing the two ends together. Against the black finish of the cabinet, the white bass/mid driver cone is a distinctive and iconic feature of the product.

The network is second-order passive, crossing over at 2 kHz. The frequency range is quoted from 60 Hz to 20 kHz, and rated power handling is 25–50 W. The early version of the speaker has press-down type input terminals; later models had screw terminals.

== Sound ==
The NS-10 does not have a flat frequency response. The sound of the NS-10 is heavily boosted in the upper midrange, and like other sealed-box speakers of similar size its bass extension is limited. It has a +5 dB boost in the midrange at around 2 kHz, and the bottom end starts rolling off at 200 Hz. The midrange response is so open that it exposes the frequencies that are the most problematic and worst-sounding to the human ear.

Many audio engineers find that if a recording sounds good on NS-10 monitors then it also sounds good on most other playback systems. Gizmodo likened the NS-10 to music editors who reveal the weaknesses of recordings — "boosting the uglier frequencies (while hiding the comfortable ones)" — so that engineers are forced to either make necessary compensation in the mix or otherwise rework them.

A 2001 report by Newell et al. at Southampton University undertaken for Studio Sound in 2001 found that the NS-10 had excellent time-domain response at low frequencies – its ability to start and stop in response to signal input was found to be superior to that of most other nearfield monitors. Part of this was related to its closed-box design. The researchers held that the extremely fast decay time of the speaker in the low frequencies ensures that the bass instruments (guitar and drums) are correctly balanced in the mix.

== Product revisions ==
There were many other versions of the NS-10, the best known of which were the "NS-10M Studio" and the "NS-10M Pro", both introduced in 1987. Technically identical to the "Studio", the "Pro" comes fitted with a speaker grille and is meant to be used in a vertical orientation.

The "professional" version launched some nine years after its first introduction on the back of the popularity of the NS-10 among engineers. The revised version, with everything including the logo and connection panel orientated horizontally, was badged "NS-10M Studio". Improvements included a new tweeter and crossover to address the problem in the treble, better connection terminals, and a sturdier cabinet that no longer accommodates grilles. The Studio reincarnation also has improved power handling – 60–120 W. In excess of 200,000 pairs of "Studio" alone were sold throughout the world.

Also in the product line-up were NS-10T, NS-10M X, NS-10MC, NS-10MT. The NS-10M X is a "Studio" with magnetic shielding and a different tweeter. In the 1990s Yamaha introduced the NS-10MT, a bass-reflex version of the 10M X with a different tweeter and grille. Designed for home cinema, it has bass response down to 43 Hz, nominal impedance of 6 ohm and maximum power handling rated at 180 W. A miniature version named Natural Sound Surround Speaker NS10MM was launched in 1997 or 1998.

== Reception ==
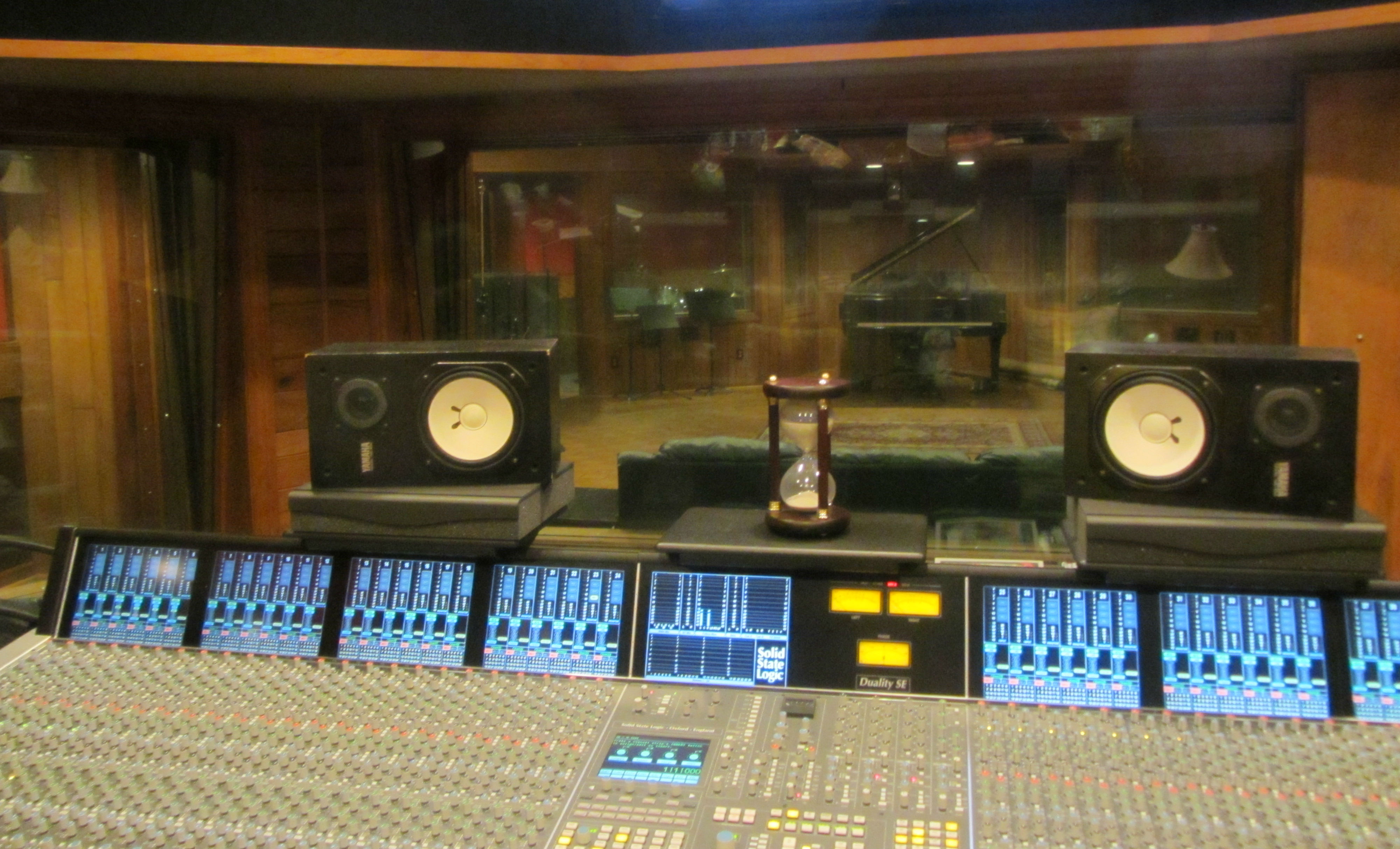
The NS-10 in Studio C, Ardent Studios

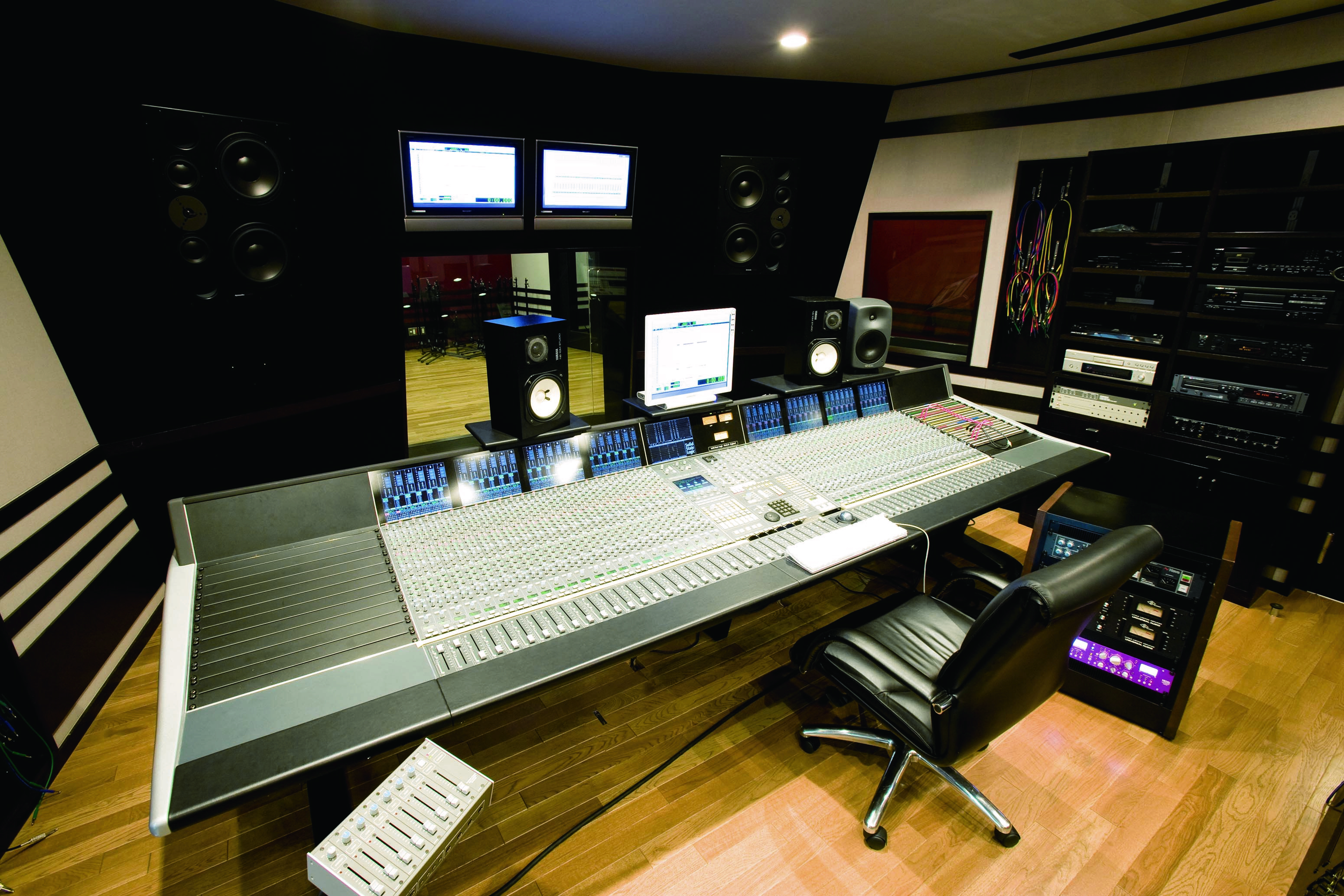
The NS-10 in a Tokyo studio

The sound quality of the NS-10 has polarised opinions, characterised as "love them or hate them". Many professionals find it indispensable, even though they may not particularly enjoy listening to it; others refuse to give it space in their studio but will happily admit that it is an effective professional tool. The reliance on the NS-10 by top independent producers became a viral phenomenon; thousands of studios equipped themselves with NS-10s to attract big named producers, making the speakers an industry standard.

== Tissue paper effect ==
Clearmountain was said to have been one of the first recording engineers to hang tissue paper over the tweeters of the NS-10 to tame the over-bright treble. Recording engineer Bob Hodas investigated the alleged sonic effects of tissue paper. He found inconsistent results with different paper, but said that tissue paper generally demonstrated an undesirable effect known as comb filtering, caused by the high frequencies being reflected back into the tweeter instead of being absorbed. Hodas derided the tissue practice as "aberrant behaviour", saying that engineers usually fear comb filtering and its associated cancellation effects. He also suggested that more controllable and less random electronic filtering would be preferable. Newell et al. noted that had the speakers' grilles been used in studios, where they are routinely removed, they would have had the same effect on the treble output as the improvised tissue paper filter.

== Influence ==
The speaker came to be relied on by independent engineers, who worked in different studios and needed equipment they were familiar with as a reference point. Throughout the 1980s, engineers and producers worked widely with the speaker to monitor "[almost] any album you love from the 80s or 90s" – from Born in the U.S.A. (Bruce Springsteen), Avalon (Roxy Music) Let's Dance (David Bowie), to Big Bam Boom (Hall and Oates).

The NS-10, and the Auratone before it, are two of the most influential nearfield monitors used in the professional mixing of sound recordings. In 2008, the NS-10 was inducted into the Mix magazine TECnology Hall of Fame. Also reflecting its influence, the speaker won a Technical Grammy for Yamaha in 2007.

As the NS-10 has been out of production for many years, in late 2018 Avantone, partnering with the mix engineer Chris Lord-Alge, released the CLA-10. Although they were careful not to mention it in any of the company's materials, many have speculated that the CLA-10 is an NS-10 clone, to fill the market gap left by Yamaha when they stopped production of the original NS-10.

In January 2019, Minneapolis Speaker Company launched a new brand of speakers called Bold North Audio. Their first product, the MS-10W, is stated to be the ideal replacement woofer for the NS-10M. The website includes copious amounts of engineering data showing driver and in-system comparisons.

== See also ==
- LS3/5A – BBC nearfield monitor
- Yamaha Pro Audio
