= Rogers International =

Audio electronics manufacturer

Rogers is a British brand name of Rogers International Ltd, a subsidiary of Wo Kee Hong Holdings Ltd, a company based in Hong Kong that produces a variety of audio electronic products.

== Description ==
The company produces a variety of hi-fi products, such as amplifiers, receivers, car audio equipment and LCD TVs, but is best known for its loudspeakers.

== History ==
Rogers was founded by Jim Rogers in 1947.

An early example was the Rogers Theatrical Horn Loudspeaker. In the early 1970s, Rogers was commissioned by the BBC to produce the LS3/5A. Some 50,000 pairs have been built worldwide to date. Meanwhile, LS 5/8 and LS 5/9 studio monitors were manufactured under licence from the BBC, and have been used in recording studios worldwide.

In 1975 Michael O'Brien as chairman and Brian Pook as M.D. buy Rogers from the receiver. To do this Michael O'Brien bought an off the shelf trading company called Swisstone. Swisstone, trading as Rogers, with 6 former employees retain the BBC licence for the LS3/5A and start manufacturing. Later in 1978 Rogers (actually Swisstone because Rogers now wasn't a company but a trading name) under Michael O'Brien and Brian Pook buy Chartwell from the official receiver.

In 1993 the brand was sold off to its new Chinese owners Wo Kee Hong Holdings, who had since developed the Rogers brand to include surround sound speakers, car audio equipment, Dolby Digital receivers and plasma and LCD TV screens. Although Wo Kee Hong owns the rights to the name, it had retained Swisstone as the sole researcher and designers of the Rogers speakers, therefore preserving the brand's British origins for a while. In 1998 as a result of a dramatic downturn in its Asian exports, the company closed the last of its UK manufacturing sites, and moved all production to Asia. In 2018, Rogers moved back to the UK and started making hifi products such as LS3/5a and LS5/9 and valve amplification.

== Products ==
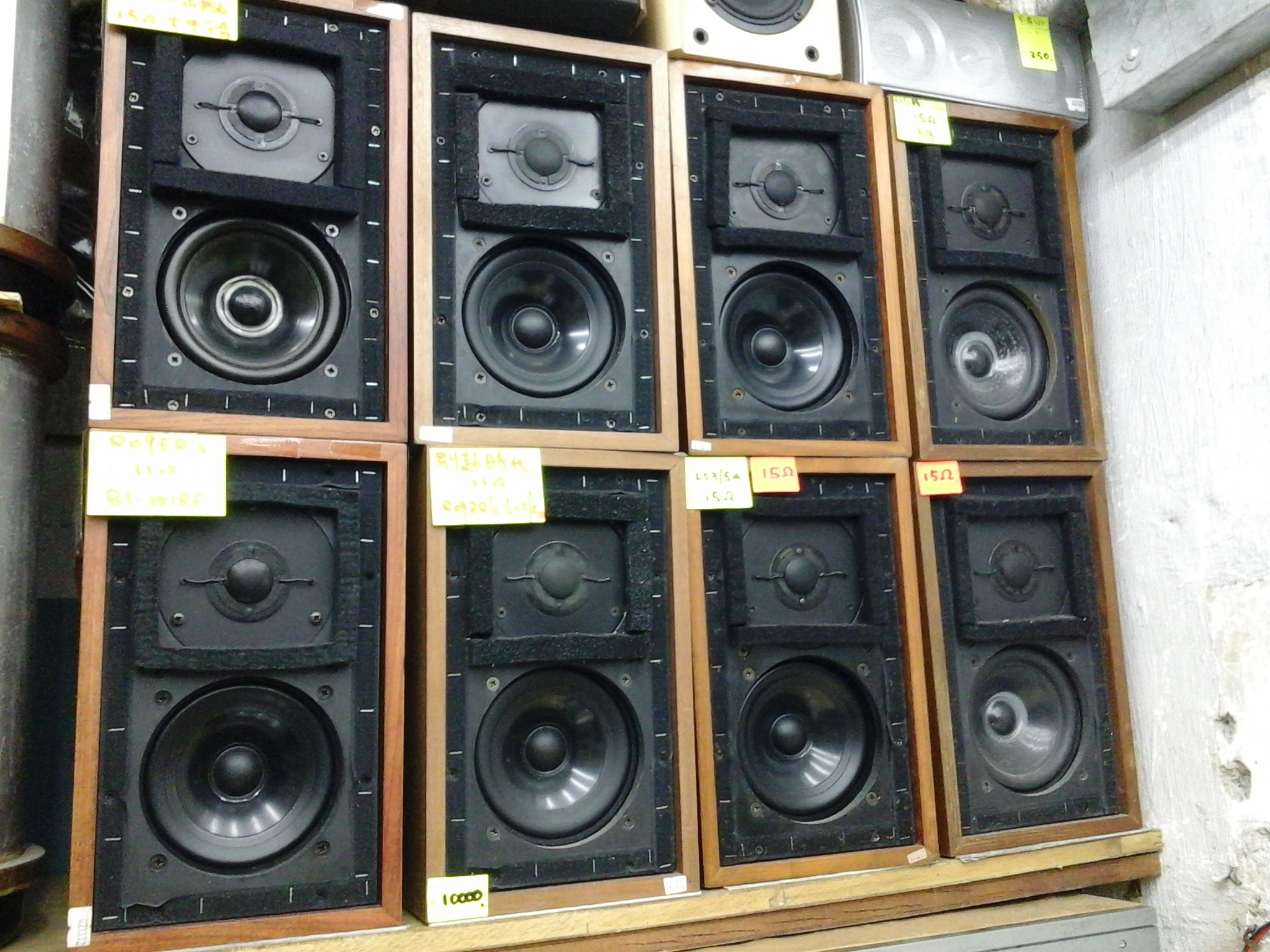
Versions of the Rogers LS3/5A on display in a second-hand shop

LS3/5A In the early 1970s, the BBC was in need of a small monitor speaker for use in restricted areas outside broadcast vans during location recording. To that end, they commissioned their Research Department to develop such a compact speaker, and an experimental loudspeaker developed during preliminary work on acoustic scaling provided the basis for the LS3/5A. The outcome was then licensed to commercial speaker companies for production. Aside from Rogers, other manufacturers licensed by the BBC to produce the LS3/5a included Chartwell, Audiomaster, Spendor, and Harbeth. The LS3/5A was Rogers' most successful loudspeaker, and to date 50,000 pairs have been built worldwide.

Other hi-fi products During the 1980s, Rogers made the A75 and A100 amplifiers and the T100 FM tuner. Rogers also produced a pair of active subwoofers, called AB3a, which were designed specifically for the LS3/5As. The subwoofers were sold complete with their own electronic crossover, which used the same chassis as the A75/A100 amplifiers.

LS 5/8 and 5/9 These studio speakers were manufactured by Rogers under licenses granted by the BBC, and have been installed in many recording studios.

"JR149" Jim Rogers, who set up J R Loudspeakers Ltd after the collapse of Rogers Audio, released the JR149 in 1977 using the same drive units as the LS3/5A in a cylindrical aluminium cabinet. A review of the JR149 in the May 1977 Hi-Fi News and Record Review found that the "general quality was very comparable" to the LS3/5A.

LS33 The final, and often overlooked, speakers to be manufactured by Rogers in the UK with qualities that build upon the DNA of previous models, displaying hugely impressive musicality, soundstaging and the clinical monitor quality that rightly won Rogers many followers in the previous decades.
