= Spencer Hughes (sound engineer) =

English audio engineer

- Born: 1924
- Died: 1983 (aged 58–59)
- Occupation: Audio engineer
- Known for: Spendor speakers

Spencer Hughes (1924–1983) was an English audio engineer who worked at the BBC research department in the 1960s. He founded Spendor to manufacture loudspeakers incorporating results of his research.

== Research ==
One object of the research was a membrane made from a polystyrene ("Bextrene") for mid-range speakers or woofers. In his letter he describes the work as follows: ″Bins full of malformed cones were produced before any measure of success was achieved ...″ And in the team worked Dudley Harwood, who founded in 1977 Harbeth Acoustics, too.

== Business ==
In 1969 he and his wife founded Spendor, the name of which is derived from the first names of both, to produce loudspeakers.

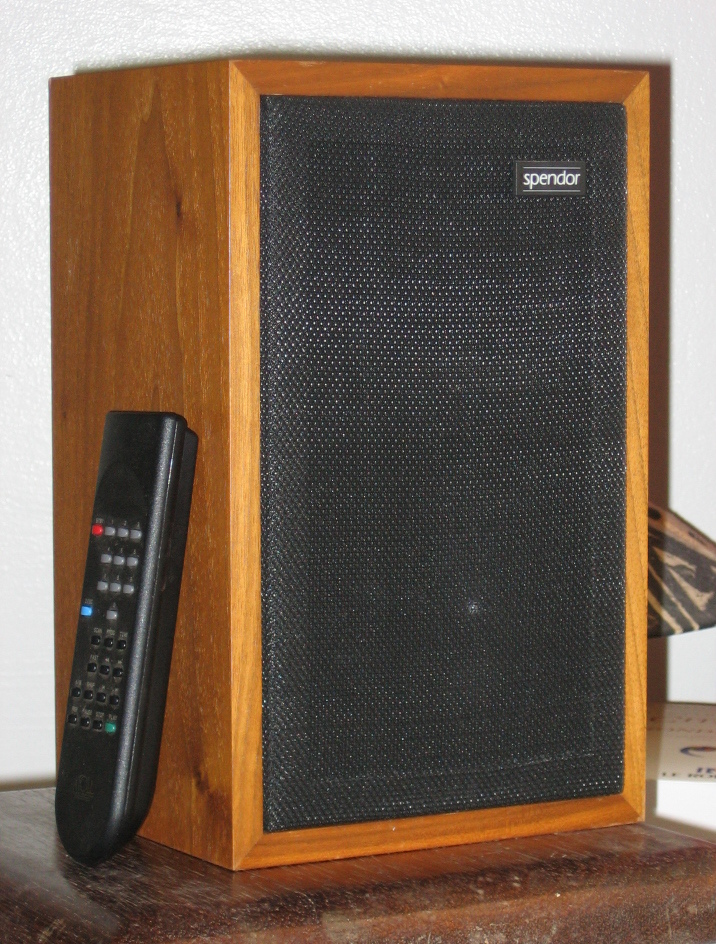
Spendor version of legendary LS3/5a

The first product was the BC1, which Spencer designed while still working for the BBC. Several other designs followed, for example BC3, SA1. Spendor also made the BBC LS3/5a under licence from the BBC.

The BC1 is bigger, and was used in many radio stations, too. In consequence the sound quality influenced many UK speaker designs.

== Family ==
Hughes and his wife Dorothy had a son Derek; he worked at Spendor (in his letter from 1980 Spencer mentioned him as assist with research and development and general running of the factory). After the untimely death of Spencer in 1983 he worked with his mother in the capacity of Technical Director, producing the original versions of what is now the Classic Series and is still working at loudspeakers as freelance consultant designer.

== See also ==
- Studio monitor
