= LS3/5A =

Small studio monitor loudspeaker originated by the BBC

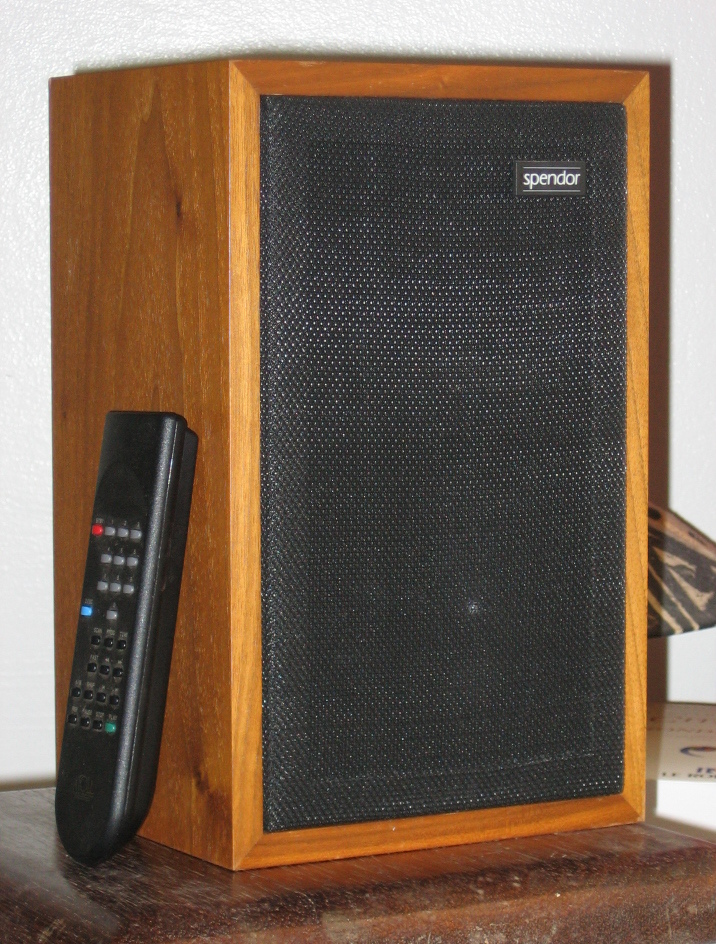
Late model (c.1998) LS3/5A from Spendor, one of the BBC licensees

The LS3/5A (each element pronounced separately, without the stroke) is a small studio monitor loudspeaker originated by the BBC for use by outside broadcast vans to ensure quality of their broadcasts. The speaker concept set out transparent and natural sound as the goal, and the achievement of the result is widely acknowledged.

The BBC granted licences to a small number of British firms, which first manufactured the product in 1975. The product underwent a change in 1987 due to consistency issues in manufacturing, and again in around 2003 when original parts from KEF ran out. Upwards of 60,000 pairs of the speaker have been sold. Reviewers have recognised its enormous importance as a bookshelf design.

== History ==
The LS3/5A is a commercially produced loudspeaker driven by the need of the BBC to monitor and assess broadcast programme quality. It was derived from the LS3/5, which was conceived and developed by the BBC Engineering Department in the early 1970s, when it was under the stewardship of Dudley Harwood. Having found no commercially produced small loudspeaker that met the requirement for naturalness and sonic neutrality, the BBC specifically set out to design a speaker to achieve natural overall sound quality and good dynamic range for monitoring broadcasts in tightly confined spaces.

As the BBC broadcasting unit was about to order another batch of the monitor, it was found that the supplier had modified the drive units, meaning the LS3/5 design had to be fundamentally revised. The BBC's Designs Department was called upon to adapt the product in light of the supply changes. Modifications were made to adapt to the new drive units and deal with the altered resonance pattern, and the LS3/5 became the LS3/5A.

The BBC then licensed the product to a small number of private sector companies. Production began in 1975. In 1987, as a result of reassessment of the product due to consistency issues in the manufacture of the mid–bass driver, the drivers were modified and the crossover changed. The overall impedance of the crossover fell to 11 ohms from the original 15 ohms.

The various official versions of the LS3/5A from various licensees sold in significant numbers in its life of over a quarter of a century. Sales estimates range from 60,000 to 100,000 pairs.

In the tail end of the 1990s, due to the parts being discontinued, the 3/5 had technically reached the end of the road. Some licensees continued to make small numbers of speakers, for a while, using re-manufactured parts. However, Stirling Broadcast, one of the last batch of licensees, completely redesigned the product based on the audio signature of the original, and launched the LS3/5A v2 with the full endorsement of the broadcaster in early 2006.

In 2014, production of the 15 ohm version of the LS3/5a with a full BBC Licence was re-commenced by Falcon Acoustics [25] using re-engineered versions of the original drive units and the original design BBC crossover [4] all produced in-house.

== Speaker ==
=== Name ===
The product name is derived from BBC naming convention: the "LS3" designation meant it was a loudspeaker intended for outside broadcasting, as opposed to the "LS5" loudspeaker, intended for studio monitoring. The number after the stroke is the model number, the LS3/5 is "number 5" outside-broadcasting loudspeaker. The letter that follows denotes alterations to the original specification, of which there was only one in this instance after the LS3/5, thus the "A".

=== Design ===
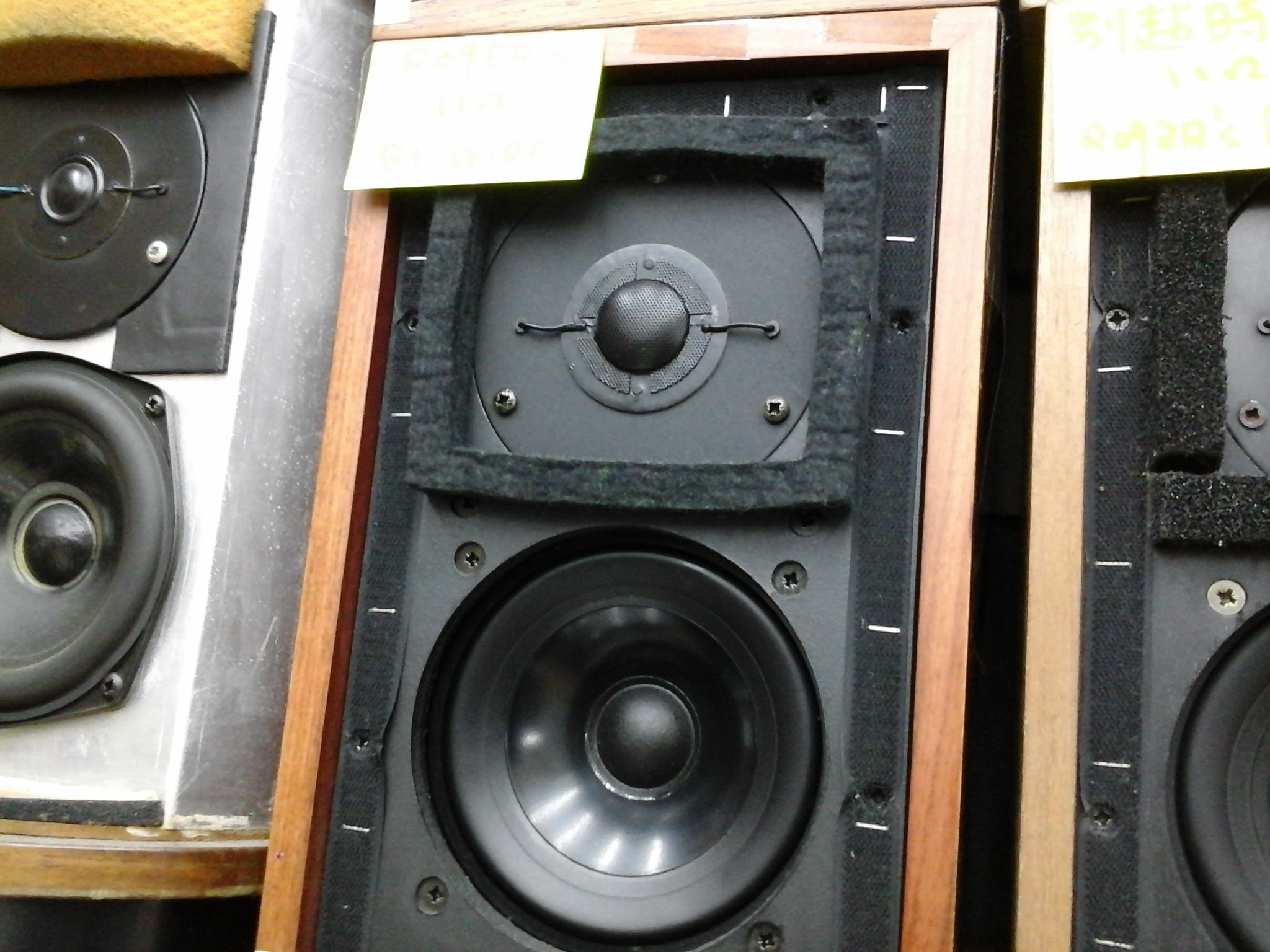
The speaker with its characteristic diffraction-absorbing foam surround for tweeter

For its outside broadcasting monitoring, the BBC required a small studio monitor suitable for near-field monitoring of the frequency range from 400 Hz to about 20 kHz. The principal constraints were space and situations where using headphones is unsatisfactory, such as in mobile broadcasting vans. There were no commercial constraints. The BBC Research Department, then situated at Kingswood Warren, were responsible for development work, and commenced scaling tests in 1968. They were able to answer a request for a prototype in under a week because it resembled an experimental loudspeaker that the department had already developed for some preliminary acoustic scaling tests. The speaker had to be voiced by ear an octave at a time, because scale test results were inapplicable to a model of this size. Engineers took measurements; comparisons were performed against the LS5/8 – a large "Grade I monitor" already in use at the time – and with live sources. In 1970 engineers came up with the LS3/5, built using the KEF B110 (A6362) and the KEF T27 (A6340) drive units, and a 9-ohm crossover filter. Estimated development costs of the order of £100,000 were said to have been incurred at the time. Approximately 20 units of the LS3/5 were produced in-house.

The BBC had initiated tendering to have the LS3/5 made under licence. As the broadcasting unit was about to order another batch of the monitor, it was found that KEF had discontinued the B110 (A6362) and the T27 (A6340) in favour of the B110 (SP1003) and T27 (SP1032) specification, and was already using them in the Coda, one of their own-brand commercial loudspeakers. Thus the design had to be revised because these new units had different impedances, technical characteristics and altered resonance patterns.[2][4] The tweeter was considered potentially fragile because it now had an exposed dome, so a suitable protection grille was found to cover and protect the dome. The tweeter was also surrounded by a thick felt rectangle to prevent interference pattern effects being created by the edge of the cabinet. The crossover also had to undergo change, and the LS3/5 became the LS3/5A in the early summer of 1974.

The KEF B110 SP1003 is a 110 mm speaker with a doped Bextrene (a proprietary type of polystyrene copolymer) cone and a neoprene surround. The KEF T27 SP1032 has a 19 mm mylar dome fitted and is with a perforated protection grille. The loudspeaker has an internal volume of approximately 5 litres. The speaker cabinet (loudspeaker enclosure) measuring 31 by 19 by 16 centimetres (12.2 in × 7.5 in × 6.3 in), is made using 12 mm (0.47 in) birch plywood strengthened at every joint with beech braces, and heavily damped. Although there was no specification for the wood of the original LS3/5 cabinets, the BBC closely specified wood types in defining the LS3/5A due to concerns that other hard woods – specifically Parana pine, with which the BBC conducted tests – would cause noticeable colouration (i.e. detract from sonic neutrality) due to interaction with a resonance of the bass drivers.

Martin Colloms notes in Hi-Fi Critic that: "Hardly any component in either enclosure or driver may be substituted without the blend suffering audible disturbance. This is because the 3/5A sets such a high standard for tonal balance that errors which would pass unnoticed in an ordinary speaker are readily exposed". The BBC then licensed the product to a small number of private sector companies.

In a review in Stereophile, John Atkinson remarked on how it was "virtually unknown for a speaker to be still available, virtually unchanged, 14 years after [its introduction]".

=== Construction ===
J. Gordon Holt indicates in Stereophile that most of the cost lay inside the case, having been spent on a complex equaliser and phase-corrected crossover. However, Holt's colleague, John Atkinson, notes that the cabinet alone "costs the manufacturer the same as the retail price of a typical massmarket [sic] speaker". Only specific speaker drivers manufactured to strict tolerances may be used. There were other measures to control diffraction and ensure tonal neutrality.

The circuitry provides equalisation in both high and low frequency sections. The 13-element crossover includes an inductor for the treble section with seven positions that allows adjustment to match level of mid to treble sensitivities. The design also specifies high quality screened air-gap inductors and film capacitors. David Prakel in Hi-Fi Answers suggests it was a costlier speaker to build than imagined because tight specifications meant a high failure rate in production – the BBC had specified "the finest, most expensive ingredients and representing an investment of hours of skilled labour".

=== Signature sound ===
Similar to sealed-box speakers of similar size, the 3/5A has little or no low bass, but the design reinforced its lower register by a boost at around 160 Hz, giving the subjective impression that the speaker is more bass-rich. It has a gently rising frequency response above 5kHz, leading reviewers to notice the sound being a little bright at the treble registers, or that the speakers "reproduce the high-end roughness of solid-state amplifiers mercilessly" thus suggested partnering with valve amplification would be advantageous. A slight nasal quality in the midrange has also been noted in the earlier versions. The accuracy and stability of its stereo imaging and its clean midrange reproduction are also appreciated qualities. J. Gordon Holt suggests that the quality was "comparable to that from Quad Electrostatics, at far lower cost and with added bonuses of slightly smoother high end, better stereo imaging, a broader listening area". John Atkinson suggests in Stereophile that the LS3/5A is ideally suited to the reproduction of program having a limited dynamic-range requirement, for example chamber music; he said that the LS3/5A "has never boogied and never will; it's just too polite ever to cut the mustard on rock, or even straightahead jazz".

=== Constructors ===
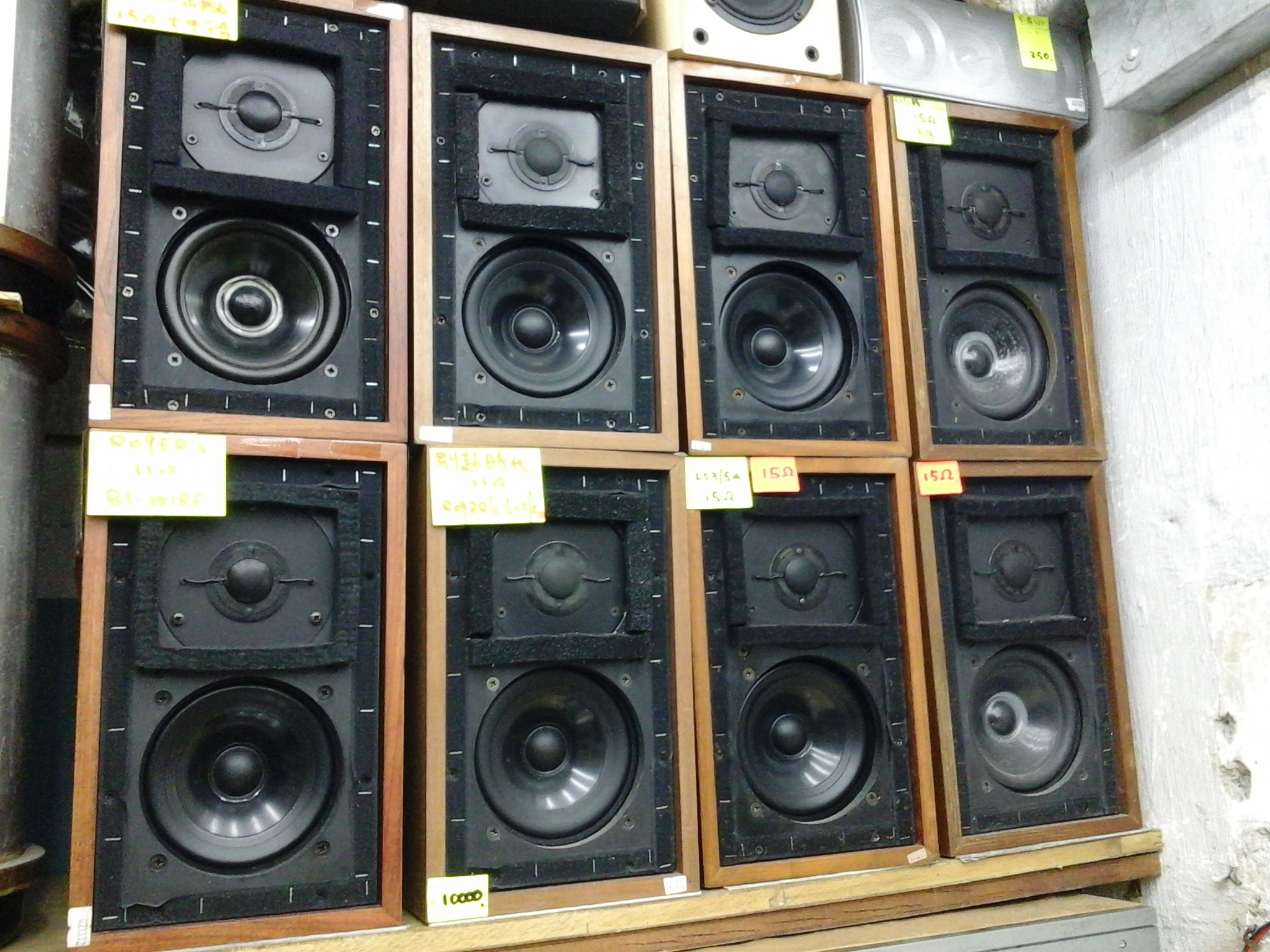
Versions of the speaker (mostly from Rogers) of various vintages on display in a second-hand shop

A total of 11 companies were ever granted licences by the BBC to manufacture the model, a maximum of 3 at any given time. The product proved highly challenging to manufacture, if for no other reason than tight specifications and consistency of parts, and many of these companies would have a chequered corporate history. Audible differences could result from the mounting screws, grille fabric, or the origin of the wool.

Rogers Audio was the earliest licensee, but went out of business before producing a single unit. The Rogers name was bought by Swisstone, who started manufacturing the 3/5A under licence in 1975. Rogers' production accounted for the majority, of around 43,000 pairs by 1988, and 50,000 pairs in total. Of the other main manufacturers, Spendor produced about 11,000 pairs, and Audiomaster 10,000. Dudley Harwood, the BBC engineer instrumental in the creation of the 3/5A, started Harbeth and obtained a licence in 1977, but the company produced no LS3/5As for a decade. Eventually, Harbeth accounted for 7,000 pairs. KEF, who obtained its licence in 1993 (and at which point there were 4 concurrent manufacturer licensees), claims approximately 4,000 pairs were made from 1994 to 1998. Other licensees included Chartwell, RAM, Goodmans, Graham Audio and Stirling Broadcast.A current licence for the 15 ohm LS3/5a is held by Falcon Acoustics

=== Reception ===
Despite not being a "commercial product" at the outset, the LS3/5A was commercially successful in its twenty-something-year life, from 1975 until approximately 2000, when the availability of KEF drive units came to an end. The speaker has amassed an "enthusiastic, focused, and loyal [...] following, and none so large or vocal", according to Paul Seydor in The Absolute Sound.

Estimates of their sales differ, possibly due to scope and cut-off: when it ceased production in 1998, "some 100,000 pairs were in circulation, with 3000 pairs sold in its last year alone", according to Seydor; in 2001, Ken Kessler similarly estimated in Hi-fi News that 100,000 pairs had been produced. In 2007, Martin Colloms reported "more than 60,000 pairs of the original LS3/5As were made". John Atkinson noted that it had sold in excess of 60,000 up to 1988, of which Rogers represented two-thirds. (Note: US retail prices/pair: $430 (1977), $450 (1984), $650 (1989), $999 (1993), $1295 (1996), $1695 (2007). Corresponding manufacturers and reference years: Rogers Loudspeakers Ltd., Mitcham, Surrey, England (1977, 1989); Spendor loudspeakers, Redhill, Surrey, England (1984); Harbeth Acoustics, Haywards Heath, West Sussex, England (1993). KEF, Maidstone, Kent, England (1996). Stirling Broadcast, Somerset, England. (2007))

Atkinson notes in 2007 that the sound of the speaker had not dated whilst many other speakers of the 1960s and 70s had. He guessed that LS3/5A remained competitive due to the exhaustive considerations and top engineering talent that went into its design; maybe some luck was involved. Art Dudley commented in Stereophile on the LS3/5A's "towering significance" as a bookshelf design.

== Product revisions ==
=== 1987–1990 ===
It had become apparent in around 1987 that a number of units already in the field were not up to specification. In particular, it was becoming increasingly difficult to obtain KEF drivers of acceptable tolerances, especially the woofer. Measurements of the 1–1.5 kHz peak of some units produced at the time were up to 6dB higher. KEF underwent a program to improve consistency of both drive-unit and the associated crossover, taking care not to alter frequency characteristics or tonal balances. KEF specially redesigned the B110, creating the B110 SP1228 where the surround changed from neoprene to a vinyl compound. KEF also designed a new crossover, designated SP2128. The crossover, also redesigned to accommodate the changes, saw its overall impedance fall to 11 ohms from the original 15 ohms. KEF also manufactured and supplied the crossover with the drive units in kits where the pairs have been electrically matched by computer to ensure balanced performance. Martin Colloms had implied in Hi-fi News in August 1988 that the BBC had taken a pragmatic decision to revise the design, to ensure that targeted production levels could be maintained.

In 1990, the BBC authorised licensees to manufacture models capable of being bi-wired, but stipulated that the performance in single-wired mode must meet the original specification. KEF started making the bi-wire crossover, designated SP2195, available in 1991.

=== 2005 – birth of LS3/5A "V2" ===
Upon obtaining a BBC licence to produce legacy 11-ohm LS3/5A, Stirling Broadcast commissioned KEF to produce new T27 and B110 drive units. Stirling had to rethink the product when KEF finally ceased manufacturing the drive units in about 2000. Working with drivers from SEAS and Scanspeak, Derek Hughes developed for Stirling a new crossover that enabled the new proprietary drivers to mimic the response of the original KEF drivers they replaced. Specifically, the T27 was replaced by a 19 mm doped fabric dome tweeter. The mid–bass unit is a formed polypropylene co-polymer cone to which a damping coating has been applied and given a synthetic rubber roll surround. The crossover has three settings of relative high frequency level, in steps of 0.5dB. Each crossover is tuned to the specific pairs of drive units. While Stirling's revision deviates technically from the specification, the company took steps to research and test to ensure the LS3/5A sound was preserved, "warts and all". Stirling added a "V2" to the designation when the product was launched in 2005 in an act of transparency, even though the broadcaster has endorsed it.

=== 2014 – 15 ohm LS3/5A back in production ===
Falcon Acoustics was granted a licence by the BBC for the 15 ohm version of the LS3/5a in 2013 and commenced production in 2014 using drive units produced in-house by Falcon Acoustics. The Falcon F B110 bass unit is a re-engineered version using the same components of the original KEF B110 SP1003 with a doped Bextrene cone and a neoprene surround. The Falcon F T27 tweeter again uses the same components as the original KEF T27 SP1032 and has a 19 mm mylar dome fitted. Both Falcon units were designed by Malcolm Jones, who, while employed at KEF between 1962 and 1974, was responsible for the design of the KEF B110 and T27 units originally used in the LS3/5 and LS3/5a. Both units are graded/selected to meet the BBC specification. Crossovers are close tolerance pair matched versions of the original BBC LS3/5a crossover design [4] using tapped transformers for high frequency adjustments. [25]

Falcon also manufacture the Q7 which, whilst using the same Falcon B110 and T27 drive units as used in the Falcon LS3/5a, has a slightly modified LS3/5a "style" enclosure. The height (309mm) and width (190mm) of the cabinet has the same dimensions as the LS3/5s but has an "extended" depth (230mm). This results in an optimal Q=0.7 and provides the speaker with extended bass response (60Hz-20kHz +/- 3dB).

== Contemporary clones ==
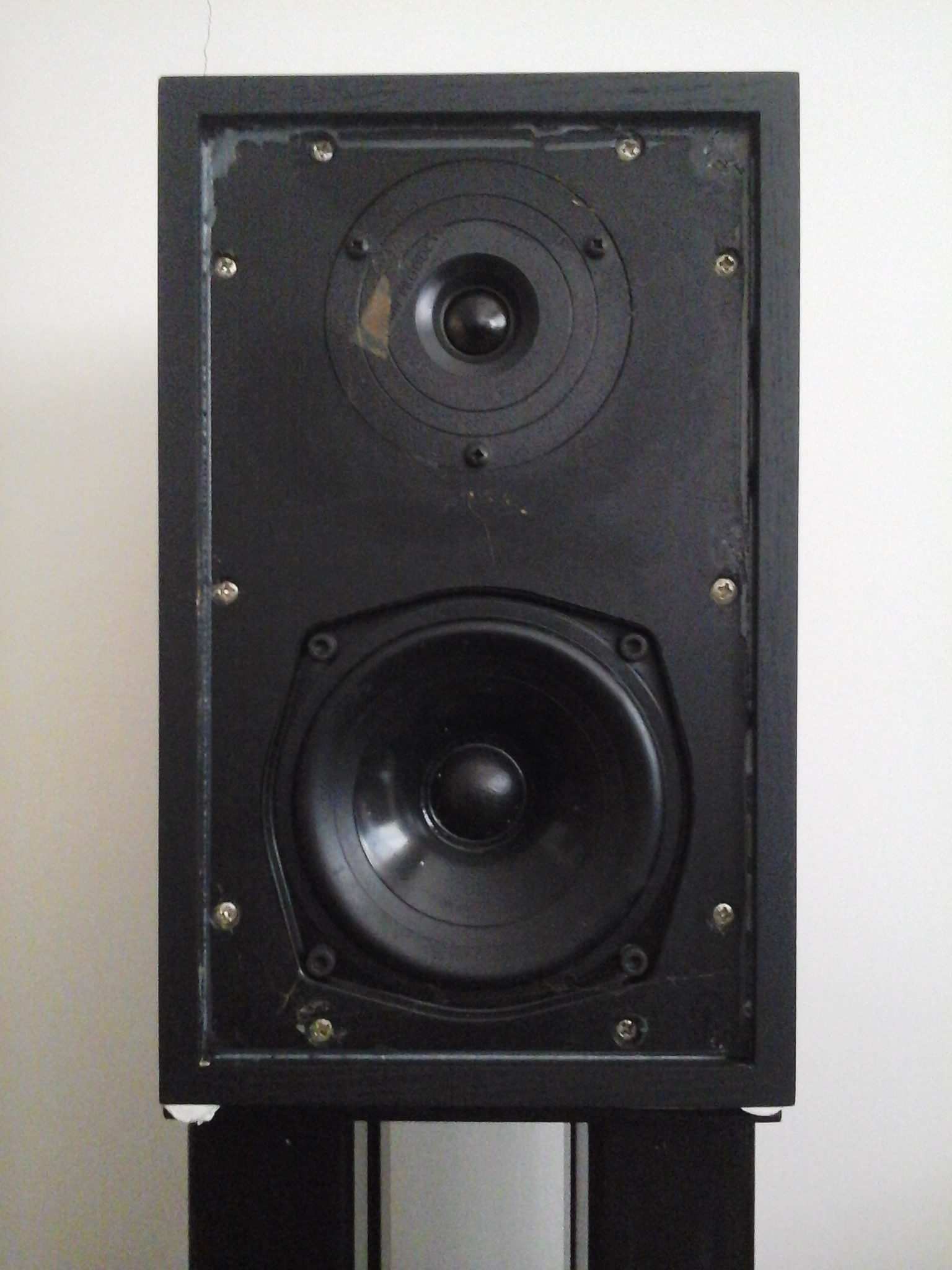
The Linn Kan, considered a clone of the LS3/5A

=== Falcon ===
Founded in 2014, Falcon Acoustics is a joint effort between Malcolm Jones and Jerry Bloomfield. Jones was a member of the original LS3/5a design team. The KEF B110 and KEF T27 have been recreated as the Falcon B110, and Falcon T27.

=== Linn ===
In 1979, Linn Products created the Kan – a non-BBC specification bookshelf speaker that used a LS3/5A-sized cabinet and the same B110 driver from KEF. Linn acquired a hundred pairs of cabinets from the supplier of the bankrupt Chartwell, and used them for the very first Kans. The Kan, however, used a Scanspeak D2008 tweeter, subsequently followed by a re-badged OEM D20-LP-1 tweeter from Hiquphon in May 1984. Linn installed a very simple crossover into the box that transformed it into "one of the fastest and most involving wall mount miniatures ever", according to Martin Colloms.

=== J R Loudspeakers ===
Jim Rogers, who set up J R Loudspeakers Ltd after the collapse of Rogers Audio, released the JR149 in 1977 using the same drive units as the LS3/5A in a cylindrical aluminium cabinet. A review of the JR149 in the May 1977 Hi-Fi News and Record Review found that the "general quality was very comparable" to the LS3/5A.

=== Spendor ===
This company, founded in Sussex in the 1960s by Spencer Hughes (a BBC electroacoustic engineer) and his wife Dorothy (hence the brandname) and later owned by Philip Swift, is known for building high-end loudspeakers.

Spendor built the LS3/5A and started with a S3/5, which was developed by Spencer's son Derek, in 1998. This type was two times modified, since 2019 the current type is the Classic 3/5.

=== KEF ===
Preceding the 3/5A, KEF's Cresta (1967), KEFKIT4 (1969), Cresta II (1970), Coda (1971) were all 2-way loudspeakers that used the B110/T27 combination. (Note: No information available on the specific versions of the B110 and T27 used in these speakers, though it is implied that the Coda used the same drivers) KEF released its CS1A constructor kit (1981) to tap the home-build market. According to the product brochure, the kit includes "the same KEF drive units originally specified for the LS3/5A with a somewhat simplified dividing network giving a similar overall frequency response characteristic".

In 1979, KEF released the Reference 101, a speaker that used the T27 (SP1032) with the B110B (SP1057) in a 6.7-litre cabinet "with a crossover of similar complexity to the LS3/5A". Martin Colloms said it possessed an almost perfectly flat frequency response, but that "it neither sounded as lifelike, nor did it really better the musical performance of the standard 3/5a".

In 2012, Kef released the LS50 which claimed to be "An innovative concept inspired by the legendary LS3/5a."

=== Harbeth ===
In 2012, Harbeth released the P3ESR. CNET contributor Steve Guttenberg commented that: "Harbeth's terrific P3ESR is a contemporary equivalent of the LS3/5A. The 12-inch-high speaker feels remarkably solid, and the lovely (real) wood veneer is impeccable. The front baffle hosts a Harbeth-made 5-inch woofer and a 0.75-inch tweeter".

=== Stirling Broadcast ===
After a long history of repairing and servicing LS3/5a's from within both the professional and amateur arenas, Stirling Broadcast became involved in the manufacture of LS3/5a loudspeakers after purchasing and reselling the bankrupt Rogers stock as NOS. Once an LS3/5a License had been obtained from the BBC, Stirling Broadcast commissioned the manufacture of new T27 and B110 drive units from KEF and reintroduced the LS3/5a to the market.

=== Audio Dandy LS3/5a ===
After KEF stopped manufacturing the LS3/5a speaker units, the LS3/5a could no longer be reproduced in its original form. In 2018 Maarten van Druten (moviemaker and audiophile from the Netherlands) designed together with LS3/5a Yahoo group member Bert a L3/5a DIY kit based on the Rogers LS3/5a version but with enhanced, more modern parts. Leon Huijgen (Liiondias) designed the external High End crossover The result is non-compromise pro audio LS3/5a that everyone is allowed to build.

== See also ==
- Yamaha NS-10
