= Spendor =

British loudspeaker manufacturing company

- Company type: Private
- Industry: Audio
- Founded: 1969
- Founder: Spencer and Dorothy Hughes
- Headquarters: England
- Area served: Worldwide
- Products: Loudspeakers
- Owner: Phillip Swift (2000-)
- Website: spendoraudio.com

Spendor is a British loudspeaker manufacturing company founded in 1969 by audio engineer Spencer Hughes (1924–1983) and his wife Dorothy. It is located in East Sussex. The name was derived from the first names of both.

== Research in the 1960s ==
Spencer Hughes worked in an investigation team of the BBC research department in the 1960s. Though journeying into Television, this was a time period when the BBC's licence budget meant the main transmission output was still radio, the imperative behind that of a BBC licensed loudspeaker was that (within the physical confines of a small bookshelf speaker) the principle objective of the loudspeaker was to reproduce an output audio signal with an acoustic fidelity to an original radio presenter's voice; principally within the entire spoken vocal range. To this end the resultant, and historically important BBC LS35A loudspeaker hit the retail market, the optional license meant any manufacture could procure a license to produce the LS35A design only if they were able to build a speaker which matched the same high fidelity standard the BBC had worked to achieve. The goal of the BBC R&D team had been reached with the original LS35A standard was now available to consumers who had the means to buy an amplification and loudspeaker system guaranteed to bring in to their homes the exact same sonic signature BBC sound engineers heard while recording and during replay. An alternative, the unwieldily, but sonically superior Quad Acoustics Electrostatic Loudspeaker ("ELS") were simply too large and pricey for most audiophiles.

One resulting offshoot of the research was a membrane made from a polystyrene ("Bextrene") for mid-range speakers or woofers.

== History ==
=== Start ===
In the first days Dorothy assisted with coil winding expertise, later she took over the general management.

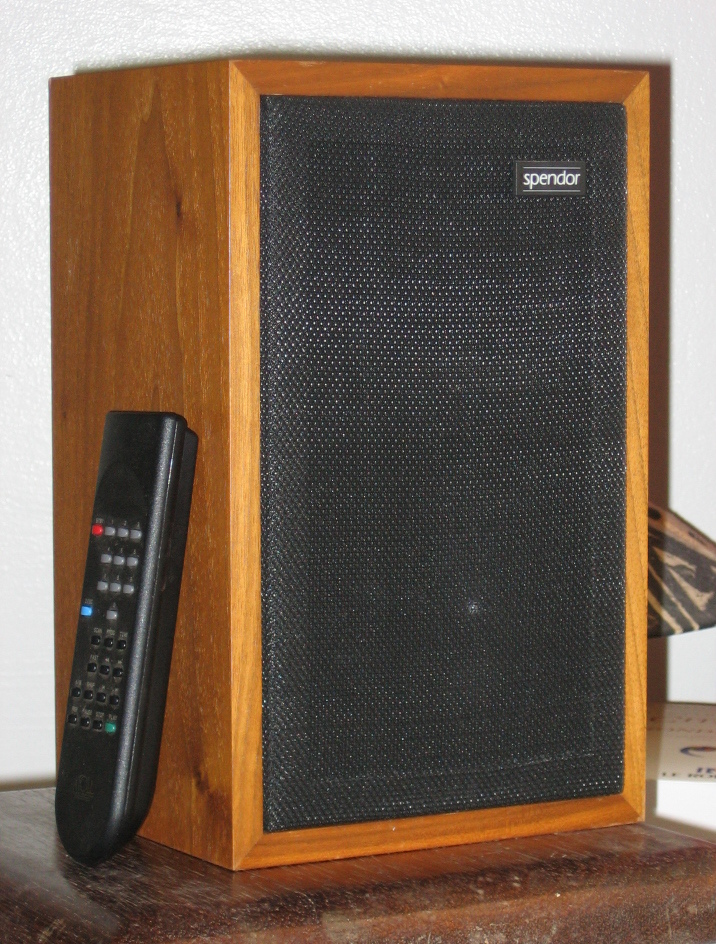
Spendor version of legendary LS3/5a

The first product was the BC1, which Spencer designed while still working for the BBC. Several other designs followed, the BC2, BC3, SA1, SP1 and other. Spendor also made the BBC LS3/5a under licence from the BBC.

The BC1 is bigger than a LS3/5a and also uses a Bextrene-membrane and was used in many radio stations, too. As a consequence many UK speaker designs are influenced by this improvement of sound quality through reduced colouration and greater consistency as well as the stereo imaging. The BC1 was built with smaller modifications until 1994.

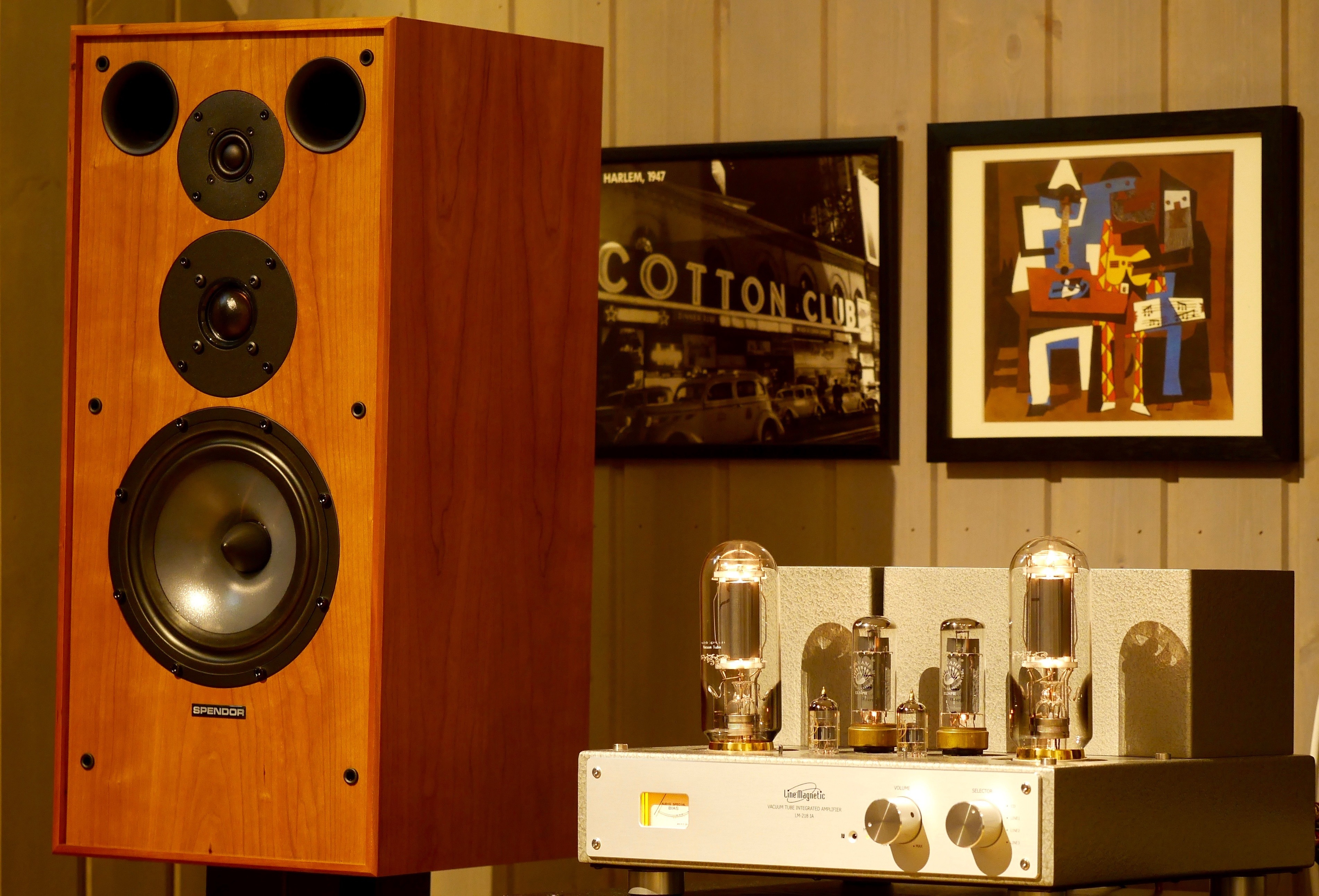
Newer loudspeaker by Spendor, Classic SP1/2R2 (modern BC1, since 2011)

The present Head of Engineering, Terry Miles, started as Spencer Hughes’ assistant in 1975.

=== Derek Hughes' time at Spendor ===
Derek Hughes, son of Spencer and his wife Dorothy, worked at Spendor (in his letter from 1980 Spencer mentioned him as assist with research and development and general running of the factory). After the untimely death of Spencer in 1983 he worked with his mother in the capacity of Technical Director, producing the original versions of what is now the Classic Series, most notably the SP1/2, SP2 and the S100 and he did amongst others the redesign of the 3/5 1998 and is still working at loudspeakers as freelance consultant designer.

=== Since 2000 ===
Since the year 2000 the company is owned by Philip Swift a speaker designer and co-founder of Audiolab, who personally knew Spencer Hughes. then sold to Ajay Shirke. Spendor develops and manufactures all components in UK.

Round about these days Spendor enlarged their product range by floorstanding loudspeakers, first with models of a S line, currently be found as loudspeakers of A line and higher end D line.

== Products 2020 ==
- A line: compact and floorstanding speakers
- Classic: until 2018 without floorstanding speakers
- D line: compact and floorstanding speakers

== See also ==
- Studio monitor
