= Electrodynamic speaker driver =

Transducer that converts an electrical audio signal to sound waves

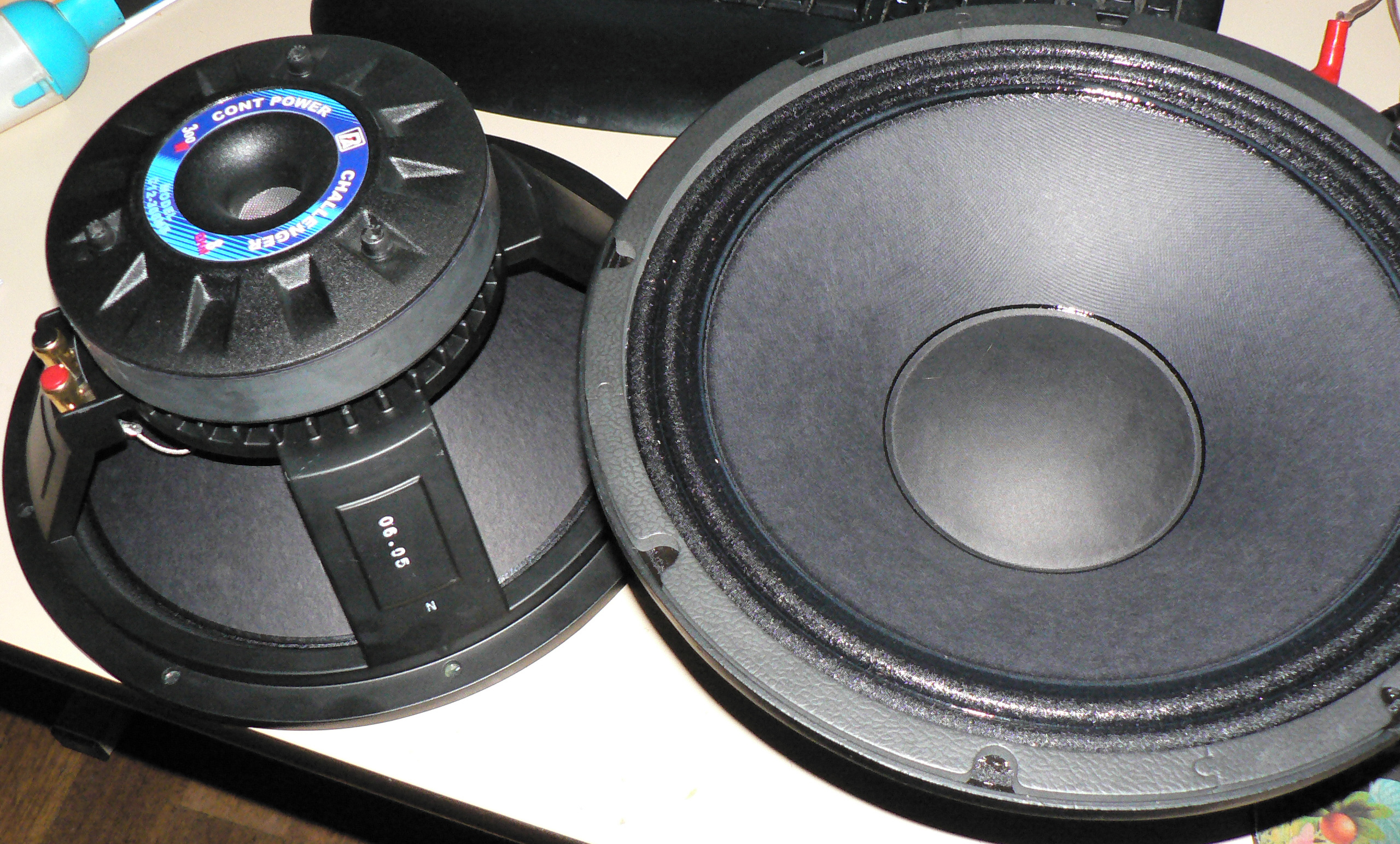
Woofer speaker drivers

An electrodynamic speaker driver, often called simply a speaker driver when the type is implicit, is an individual transducer that converts an electrical audio signal to sound waves. While the term is sometimes used interchangeably with the term speaker (loudspeaker), it is usually applied to specialized transducers that reproduce only a portion of the audible frequency range, or to the one or more drivers within a loudspeaker cabinet (or simply "speaker".). For high fidelity reproduction of sound, multiple loudspeakers are often mounted in the same enclosure, each reproducing a different part of the audible frequency range. In this case the individual speakers are referred to as drivers and the entire unit is called a loudspeaker. Drivers made for reproducing high audio frequencies are called tweeters, those for middle frequencies are called mid-range drivers (much less commonly called squawkers), and those for low frequencies are called woofers, while those for very low bass range are subwoofers. Less common types of drivers are supertweeters and rotary woofers.

The electroacoustic mechanism most widely used in speakers to convert the electric current to sound waves is the dynamic or electrodynamic driver, invented in 1925 by Edward W. Kellogg and Chester W. Rice, which creates sound with a coil of wire called a voice coil suspended between the poles of a magnet. There are others that are far less widely used: electrostatic drivers, piezoelectric drivers, planar magnetic drivers, Heil air motion drivers, and ionic drivers, among other speaker designs.

== Design ==
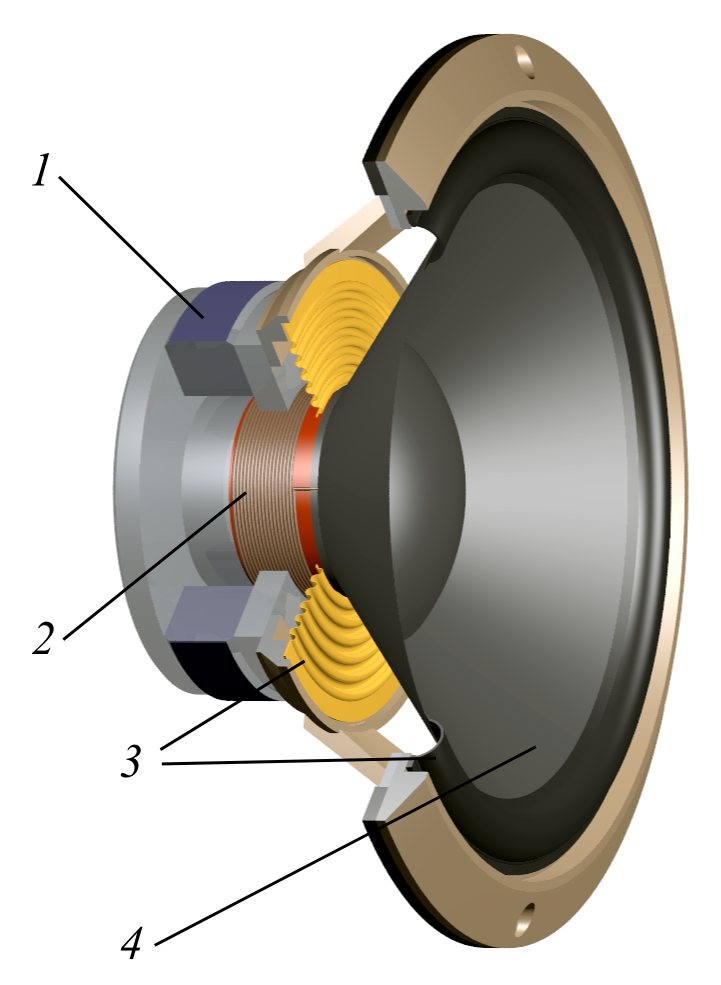
Cutaway view of a dynamic loudspeaker for the bass register: 1. Magnet; 2. Voice coil; 3. Suspension; 4. Diaphragm

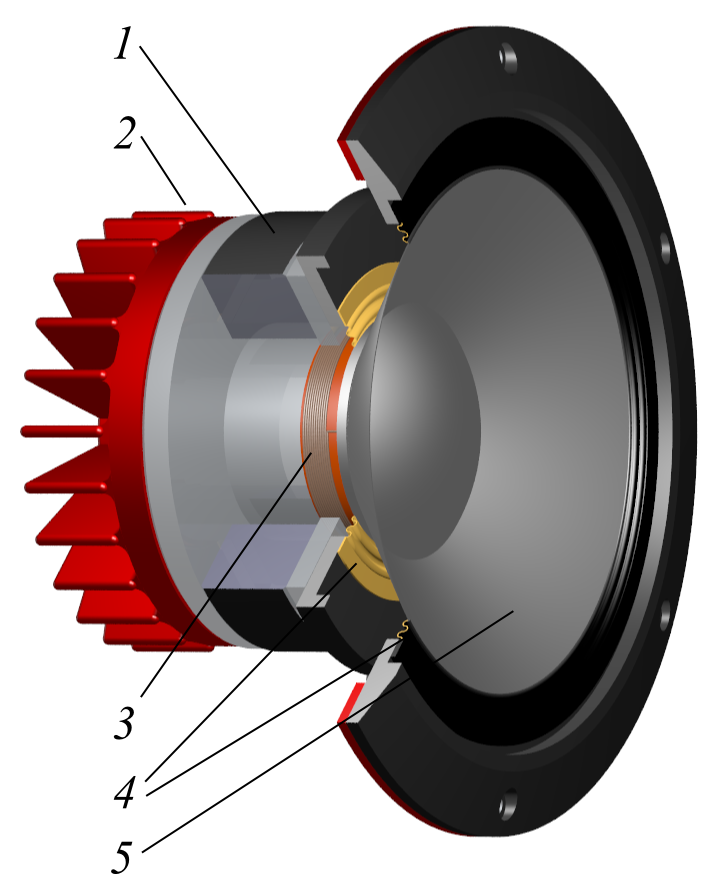
Cutaway view of a dynamic midrange speaker: 1. Magnet; 2. Cooler (sometimes present); 3. Voice coil; 4. Suspension; 5. Diaphragm

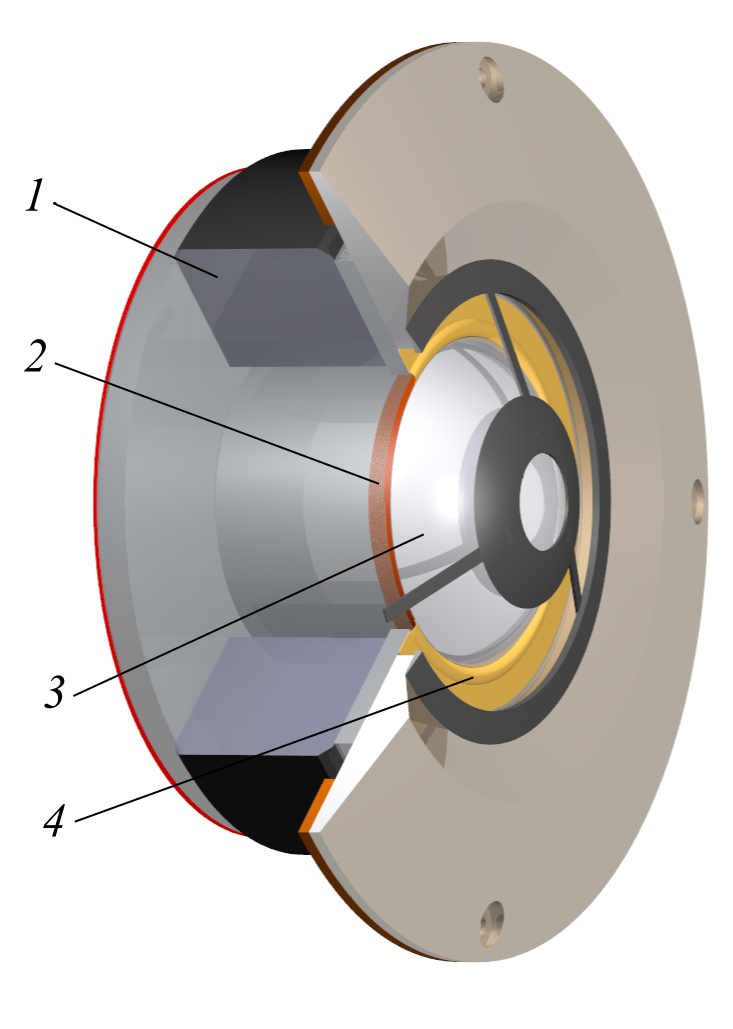
Cutaway view of a dynamic tweeter with acoustic lens and a dome-shaped membrane: 1. Magnet; 2. Voice coil; 3. Diaphragm; 4. Suspension

Diagram showing how sound data turns into sound waves: A computer representation of sound data is turned into an electrical current, which creates an electromagnetic force, which moves a speaker diaphragm, which creates sound waves. Note that since the driver is a driven damped harmonic oscillator, the position of the driver doesn't directly match the electric current.

The most common type of driver, commonly called a dynamic loudspeaker, uses a lightweight diaphragm, or cone, connected to a rigid basket, or frame, via a flexible suspension, commonly called a spider, that constrains a voice coil to move axially through a cylindrical magnetic gap. A protective dust cap glued in the cone's center prevents dust, most importantly ferromagnetic debris, from entering the gap.

When an electrical signal is applied to the voice coil, a magnetic field is created by the electric current in the voice coil, making it a variable electromagnet. The coil and the driver's magnetic system interact in a manner similar to a solenoid, generating a mechanical force that moves the coil (and thus, the attached cone). Application of alternating current moves the cone back and forth, accelerating and reproducing sound under the control of the applied electrical signal coming from the amplifier.

The following is a description of the individual components of this type of loudspeaker.

=== Diaphragm ===
The diaphragm is usually manufactured with a cone- or dome-shaped profile. A variety of different materials may be used, but the most common are paper, plastic, and metal. The ideal material is rigid, to prevent uncontrolled cone motions, has low mass to minimize starting force requirements and energy storage issues and is well damped to reduce vibrations continuing after the signal has stopped with little or no audible ringing due to its resonance frequency as determined by its usage. In practice, all three of these criteria cannot be met simultaneously using existing materials; thus, driver design involves trade-offs. For example, paper is light and typically well-damped, but is not stiff; metal may be stiff and light, but it usually has poor damping; plastic can be light, but typically, the stiffer it is made, the poorer the damping. As a result, many cones are made of some sort of composite material. For example, a cone might be made of cellulose paper, into which some carbon fiber, Kevlar, glass, hemp or bamboo fibers have been added; or it might use a honeycomb sandwich construction; or a coating might be applied to it so as to provide additional stiffening or damping.

=== Basket ===
The chassis, frame, or basket is designed to be rigid, preventing deformation that could change critical alignments with the magnet gap, perhaps allowing the voice coil to rub against the magnet around the gap. Chassis are typically cast from aluminum alloy, in heavier magnet-structure speakers; or stamped from thin sheet steel in lighter-structure drivers. Other materials such as molded plastic and damped plastic compound baskets are becoming common, especially for inexpensive, low-mass drivers. A metallic chassis can play an important role in conducting heat away from the voice coil; heating during operation changes resistance, causes physical dimensional changes, and if extreme, burns the varnish on the voice coil; it may even demagnetize permanent magnets.

=== Suspension ===
The suspension system keeps the coil centered in the gap and provides a restoring (centering) force that returns the cone to a neutral position after moving. A typical suspension system consists of two parts: the spider, which connects the diaphragm or voice coil to the lower frame and provides the majority of the restoring force, and the surround, which helps center the coil/cone assembly and allows free pistonic motion aligned with the magnetic gap. The spider is usually made of a corrugated fabric disk, impregnated with a stiffening resin. The name comes from the shape of early suspensions, which were two concentric rings of Bakelite material, joined by six or eight curved legs. Variations of this topology included the addition of a felt disc to provide a barrier to particles that might otherwise cause the voice coil to rub.

The cone surround can be rubber or polyester foam, treated paper or a ring of corrugated, resin-coated fabric; it is attached to both the outer cone circumference and to the upper frame. These diverse surround materials, their shape and treatment can dramatically affect the acoustic output of a driver; each implementation has advantages and disadvantages. Polyester foam, for example, is lightweight and economical, though usually leaks air to some degree and is degraded by time, exposure to ozone, UV light, humidity and elevated temperatures, limiting useful life before failure.

=== Voice coil ===
The wire in a voice coil is usually made of copper, though aluminum—and, rarely, silver—may be used. The advantage of aluminum is its light weight, which reduces the moving mass compared to copper. This raises the resonant frequency of the speaker and increases its efficiency. A disadvantage of aluminum is that it is not easily soldered, and so connections must be robustly crimped together and sealed. Voice-coil wire cross sections can be circular, rectangular, or hexagonal, giving varying amounts of wire volume coverage in the magnetic gap space. The coil is oriented co-axially inside the gap; it moves back and forth within a small circular volume (a hole, slot, or groove) in the magnetic structure. The gap establishes a concentrated magnetic field between the two poles of a permanent magnet; the outside ring of the gap is one pole, and the center post (called the pole piece) is the other. The pole piece and backplate are often made as a single piece, called the poleplate or yoke.

=== Magnet ===
The size and type of magnet and details of the magnetic circuit differ, depending on design goals. For instance, the shape of the pole piece affects the magnetic interaction between the voice coil and the magnetic field, and is sometimes used to modify a driver's behavior. A shorting ring, or Faraday loop, may be included as a thin copper cap fitted over the pole tip or as a heavy ring situated within the magnet-pole cavity. The benefits of this complication are reduced impedance at high frequencies, providing extended treble output, reduced harmonic distortion, and a reduction in the inductance modulation that typically accompanies large voice coil excursions. On the other hand, the copper cap requires a wider voice-coil gap, with increased magnetic reluctance; this reduces available flux, requiring a larger magnet for equivalent performance.

Electromagnets were often used in musical instrument amplifiers cabinets well into the 1950s; there were economic savings in those using tube amplifiers as the field coil could, and usually did, do double duty as a power supply choke. Very few manufacturers still produce electrodynamic loudspeakers with electrically powered field coils, as was common in the earliest designs.

Alnico, an alloy of aluminum, nickel, and cobalt, became popular after WWII, since it dispensed with the problems of field-coil drivers. Alnico was commonly used until the 1960s, despite the problem of alnico magnets being partially demagnetized. In the 1960s, most driver manufacturers switched from alnico to ferrite magnets, which are made from a mix of ceramic clay and fine particles of barium or strontium ferrite. Although the energy per kilogram of these ceramic magnets is lower than alnico, it is substantially less expensive, allowing designers to use larger yet more economical magnets to achieve a given performance. Due to increases in transportation costs and a desire for smaller, lighter devices, there is a trend toward the use of more compact rare-earth magnets made from materials such as neodymium and samarium cobalt.

== Components ==
Cut-away view of a dynamic loudspeaker

Speaker drivers include a diaphragm that moves back and forth to create pressure waves in the air column in front, and depending on the application, at some angle to the sides. The diaphragm is typically in the shape of a cone for low and mid frequencies or a dome for higher frequencies, or less commonly, a ribbon, and is usually made of coated or uncoated paper or polypropylene plastic. More exotic materials are used on some drivers, such as woven fiberglass, carbon fiber, aluminum, titanium, pure cross carbon and a very few use PEI, polyimide, PET film plastic film as the cone, dome or radiator.

All speaker drivers have a means of electrically inducing back-and-forth motion. Typically, there is a tightly wound coil of insulated wire (known as a voice coil) attached to the neck of the driver's cone. In a ribbon speaker, the voice coil may be printed or bonded onto a sheet of very thin paper, aluminum, fiberglass or plastic. This cone, dome or other radiator is mounted at its outer edge by a flexible surround to a rigid frame which supports a permanent magnet in close proximity to the voice coil. For the sake of efficiency, the relatively lightweight voice coil and cone are the moving parts of the driver, whereas the much heavier magnet remains stationary. Other typical components are a spider or damper, used as the rear suspension element, simple terminals or binding posts to connect the audio signal, and possibly a compliant gasket to seal the joint between the chassis and enclosure.

== Enclosures and acoustic isolation ==
Drivers are almost universally mounted into a rigid enclosure of wood, plastic, or occasionally metal. This loudspeaker enclosure or speaker box isolates the acoustic energy from the front of the cone from that of the back of the cone. A horn may be employed to increase efficiency and directionality. A grille, fabric mesh, or other acoustically neutral screen is generally provided to cosmetically conceal the drivers and hardware, and to protect the driver from physical damage.

== Operation ==
In operation, a signal is delivered to the voice coil by means of electrical wires, from the amplifier through speaker cable, then through flexible tinsel wire to the moving coil. The current creates a magnetic field that causes the diaphragm to be alternately forced one way or the other, by the magnetic field produced by current flowing in the voice coil, against the field established in the magnetic gap by the fixed magnet structure as the electrical signal varies. The resulting back-and-forth motion drives the air in front of the diaphragm, resulting in pressure differentials that travel away as sound waves.

The spider and surround act as a spring-restoring mechanism for motion away from the balanced position established when the driver was assembled at the factory. In addition, each contributes to centering the voice coil and cone, both concentrically within the magnet assembly, and front-to-back, restoring the voice coil to a critical position within the magnetic gap, neither toward one end nor the other.

The voice coil and magnet essentially form a linear motor working against the centering "spring tension" of the spider and surround. If there were no restriction on travel distance imposed by the spider and surround, the voice coil could be ejected from the magnet assembly at high power levels, or travel inward deep enough to collide with the back of the magnet assembly. The majority of speaker drivers work only against the centering forces of the spider and surround and do not actively monitor the position of the driver element or attempt to precisely position it. Some speaker driver designs have provisions to do so (typically termed servomechanisms); these are generally used only in woofers and especially subwoofers, due to the greatly increased cone excursions required at those frequencies in a driver whose cone size is well under the wavelength of some of the sounds it is made to reproduce (ie, bass frequencies below perhaps 100 Hz or so).

== Performance characteristics ==
Speaker drivers may be designed to operate within a broad or narrow frequency range. Small diaphragms are not well suited to moving the large volume of air that is required for good low-frequency response. Conversely, large drivers may have heavy voice coils and cones that limit their ability to move at very high frequencies. Drivers pressed beyond their design limits may have high distortion. In a multi-way loudspeaker system, specialized drivers are provided to produce specific frequency ranges, and the incoming signal is split by a crossover. Drivers can be sub-categorized into several types: full-range, tweeters, super tweeters, mid-range drivers, woofers, and subwoofers.

=== Excursion ===
Excursion is defined as how far the cone of a speaker linearly travels from its resting position. Lower frequency drivers or subwoofers are designed to move more air and have more excursion than those designed to reproduce higher frequencies. If a speaker is pushed beyond its limits, overexcursion, or bottoming out, can occur as the voice coil either slips out of the magnetic gap or hits the bottom of it.

==== Excursion Extremes ====
The MTX Jackhammer, a 22-inch subwoofer, is capable of 2.5 inches of linear cone excursion, one way.

The Thunder 1000000, an experimental subwoofer with a diameter of 60 inches, is capable of 3 inches of one-way cone excursion.

== Applications ==
Speaker drivers are the primary means for sound reproduction. They are used among other places in audio applications such as loudspeakers, headphones, telephones, megaphones, instrument amplifiers, television and monitor speakers, public address systems, portable radios, toys, and in many electronics devices that are designed to emit sound.

== See also ==
- Electrical characteristics of dynamic loudspeakers, chief electrical characteristic of a dynamic loudspeaker's driver
- Loudspeaker § Driver design: dynamic loudspeakers
- Loudspeaker enclosure
- Power handling
