= MFB =

MFB may refer to:

- Marxist Forward Bloc, a political party in India
- Medial forebrain bundle, a neural pathway containing fibers
- Metropolitan Fire Brigade (Melbourne), a fire service in Victoria, Australia
- Motional Feedback (also MFB), an active high fidelity loudspeaker system
- Mumbai Fire Brigade, a fire service in Mumbai, Maharashtra, India
