= Output compare =

System's ability to trigger a timed output

Output compare is the ability to trigger an output based on a timestamp in memory, without interrupting the execution of code by a processor or microcontroller. This is a functionality provided by many embedded systems. The corresponding ability to record a timestamp in memory when an input occurs is called input capture.

== Operation ==
In an output compare system, a timer or counter is compared with one or more programmed compare values. When the timer value matches a compare value, a compare-match event occurs. Depending on the operating mode, the event can change the state of an output pin, generate a pulse, trigger an interrupt, or be used for waveform generation such as pulse-width modulation (PWM).
