= Woofer =

Loudspeaker driver designed to produce low frequency sounds

A woofer or bass speaker is a loudspeaker driver designed to produce low frequency and mid-frequency sounds, typically from 50 up to 2000 Hz. The name is from the onomatopoeic English word for a dog's deep bark, "woof" (in contrast to a tweeter, the name used for loudspeakers designed to reproduce high-frequency sounds, deriving from the shrill calls of birds, "tweets"). The most common design for a woofer is the electrodynamic driver, which typically uses a stiff paper cone, driven by a voice coil surrounded by a magnetic field.

The voice coil is attached by adhesives to the back of the loudspeaker cone. The voice coil and the magnet form a linear electric motor. When current flows through the voice coil, the coil moves in relation to the frame according to Fleming's left hand rule for motors, causing the coil to push or pull on the driver cone in a piston-like way. The resulting motion of the cone creates sound waves, as it moves in and out.

At ordinary sound pressure levels (SPL), most humans can hear down to about 20 Hz. Woofers are generally used to cover the lowest octaves of a loudspeaker's frequency range. In two-way loudspeaker systems, the drivers handling the lower frequencies are also obliged to cover a substantial part of the midrange, often as high as 800 to 1000 Hz; such drivers are commonly termed mid woofers. Since the 1990s, a type of woofer which is designed for very low frequencies only, the subwoofer, has come to be commonly used in home theater systems and PA systems to augment the bass response; subwoofers frequency response generally ranges from 45 to 100 Hz, although professional larger subwoofers found in outdoor festivals can reach frequencies down to 20 Hz.

== Design ==
Cross section of a standard loudspeaker, not to scale

Good woofer design requires effectively converting a low frequency amplifier signal to mechanical air movement with high fidelity and acceptable efficiency, and is both assisted and complicated by the necessity of using a loudspeaker enclosure to couple the cone motion to the air. If done well, many of the other problems of woofer design (for instance, linear excursion requirements) are reduced.

In most cases the woofer and its enclosure must be designed to work together. Usually the enclosure is designed to suit the characteristics of the speaker or speakers used. The size of the enclosure is a function of the longest wavelengths (lowest frequencies) to be reproduced, and the woofer enclosure is much larger than required for midrange and high frequencies.

A crossover network, either passive or active, filters the band of frequencies to be handled by the woofer and other speakers. Normally the crossover and speaker system, including the woofer, are expected to convert the electrical signal supplied by the amplifier to an acoustic signal of identical waveform without other interaction between the amplifier and speakers, although sometimes the amplifier and speakers are designed together with the speakers supplying distortion-correcting negative feedback to the amplifier.

There are many challenges in woofer design and manufacture. Most have to do with controlling the motion of the cone so the electrical signal to the woofer's voice coil is faithfully reproduced by the sound waves produced by the cone's motion. Problems include damping the cone cleanly without audible distortion so that it does not continue to move, causing ringing, when the instantaneous input signal falls to zero each cycle, and managing high excursions (usually required to reproduce loud sounds) with low distortion. There are also challenges in presenting to the amplifier an electrical impedance which is nearly the same at all frequencies.

An early version of the now widely used bass-reflex cabinet design was patented by Albert L. Thuras of Bell Laboratories in 1932.

== Active loudspeakers ==
In 1965, Sennheiser Electronics introduced the Philharmonic sound system, which used electronics to overcome some of the problems ordinary woofer subsystems confront. They added a motion sensor to the woofer, and used the signal corresponding to its actual motion to feedback as a control input to a specially designed amplifier. If carefully done, this can improve performance (both in 'tightness', and extension of low frequency performance) considerably at the expense of flexibility (the amplifier and the speaker are tied together permanently) and cost.

As electronics costs have decreased, it has become common to have sensor-equipped woofers in inexpensive 'music systems', boom boxes, or even car audio systems. This is usually done in an attempt to get better performance from inexpensive or undersized drivers in lightweight or poorly designed enclosures. This approach presents difficulties as not all distortion can be eliminated using servo techniques, and a poorly designed enclosure can swamp the benefits from any attempt at electronic correction.

=== Equalized loudspeakers ===
Because the characteristics of a loudspeaker can be measured, and to a considerable extent predicted, it is possible to design special circuitry that somewhat compensates for the deficiencies of a speaker system.

Equalization techniques are used in most public address and sound reinforcement applications. Here, the problem is not primarily hi-fi reproduction, but managing the acoustic environment. In this case, the equalization must be individually adjusted to match the particular characteristics of the loudspeaker systems used and the room in which they are used.

== Digital filtering crossover and equalization ==
Computer techniques, in particular digital signal processing (DSP), make possible a higher precision crossover. By using finite impulse response (FIR) and other digital techniques, the crossovers for a bi-amped or tri-amped system can be accomplished with a precision not possible with analog filters, whether passive or active. Furthermore, many driver peculiarities (down to and including individual variances) can be remedied at the same time such as in Klein and Hummel's recent designs. This approach is complex and thus not likely to be used in lower cost equipment.

== Cone materials ==
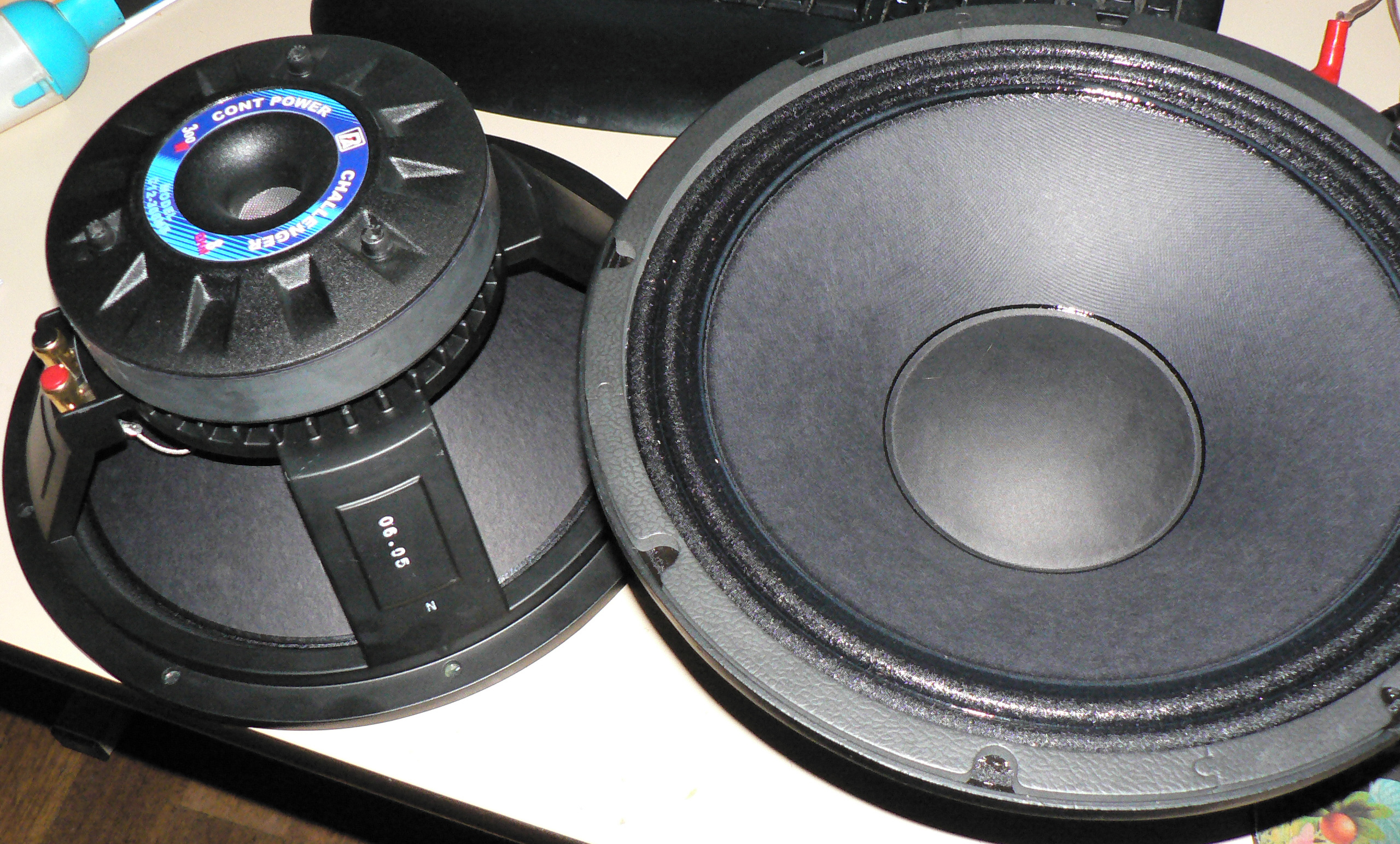
Two P-Audio Woofers. Note the cast frame, vented pole piece and reinforced paper cone.

All cone materials have advantages and disadvantages. The three chief properties designers look for in cones are light weight, stiffness, and lack of coloration (due to absence of ringing). Exotic materials like Kevlar and magnesium are light and stiff, but can have ringing problems, depending on their fabrication and design. Materials like paper (including coated paper cones) and various polymers will generally ring less than metal diaphragms, but can be heavier and not as stiff. There have been good and bad woofers made with every type of cone material. Almost every kind of material has been used for cones, from glass fiber, bamboo fiber, to expanded aluminum honeycomb sandwiches, and mica-loaded plastic cones.

== Frame design ==
The frame, or basket, is the structure holding the cone, voice coil and magnet in the proper alignment. Since the voice coil gap is quite narrow (clearances are typically in the low thousandths of an inch), rigidity is important to prevent rubbing of the voice coil against the magnet structure in the gap and also avoid extraneous motions. There are two main metal frame types, stamped and cast. Stamped baskets (usually of steel) are a lower-cost approach. The disadvantage of this type of frame is that the basket may flex if the speaker is driven at high volumes, there being resistance to bending only in certain directions. Cast baskets are more expensive, but are usually more rigid in all directions, have better damping (reducing their own resonance), can have more intricate shapes, and are therefore usually preferred for higher quality drivers.

== Power handling ==
An important woofer specification is its power rating, the amount of power the woofer can handle without damage. The electrical power rating is not easily characterized and many manufacturers cite peak ratings attainable only for very brief moments without damage. Woofer power ratings become important when the speaker is pushed to extremes: applications requiring high output, amplifier overload conditions, unusual signals (i.e., non-musical ones), very low frequencies at which the enclosure provides little or no acoustic loading (and so there will be maximum cone excursion), or amplifier failure. In high-volume situations, a woofer's voice coil will heat up, increase its resistance, causing "power compression", a condition where output sound power level decreases after extended high power activity. Further heating can physically distort the voice coil, causing scuffing, shorting due to wire insulation deterioration, or other electrical or mechanical damage. Sudden impulse energy can melt a section of voice coil wire, causing an open circuit and a dead woofer; the necessary level will vary with driver characteristics. In normal listening level music applications, the electrical power rating of woofers is generally unimportant; it remains important for higher frequency drivers.

There are three types of power handling in loudspeaker drivers, including woofers: thermal (heat), electrical (both covered above), and mechanical. The mechanical power handling limit is reached when cone excursion extends to its maximum limit. Thermal power handling limits may be reached when fairly high power levels are fed to a woofer for too long, even if not exceeding mechanical limits at any time. Most of the energy applied to the voice coil is converted to heat, not sound; the heat is passed to the pole piece, the rest of the magnet structure, and the frame. From the woofer structure, the heat is eventually dissipated into the surrounding air. Some drivers include provisions for better cooling (e.g., vented magnet pole pieces, dedicated heat conduction structures) to reduce increased coil/magnet/frame temperatures during operation, especially high power level conditions. If too much power is applied to the voice coil as compared to its ability to shed heat, it will eventually exceed a maximum safe temperature. Adhesives can melt, the voice coil former can melt or distort, or the insulation separating the voice coil windings can fail. Each of these events will damage the woofer, perhaps beyond usability.

== Public address (PA) and instrument applications ==
Woofers designed for public address system (PA) and instrument amplifier applications are similar in makeup to home audio woofers, except that they are usually designed more ruggedly. Typically, design variances include: cabinets built for repeated shipping and handling, larger woofer cones to allow for higher sound pressure levels, more robust voice coils to withstand higher power, and higher suspension stiffness. Generally, a home woofer used in a PA/instrument application can be expected to fail more quickly than a PA/instrument woofer. On the other hand, a PA/instrument woofer in a home audio application will not have the same quality of performance, particularly at low volumes. A PA woofer will not produce the same audible high fidelity which is the goal of high quality home audio due to those differences.

PA system woofers typically have high efficiency and high power handling capacity. The trade-off for high efficiency at reasonable cost is usually relatively low excursion capability (i.e., inability to move "in and out" as far as many home woofers can), as they are intended for horn or large reflex enclosures. They are also usually ill-suited to extended low bass response since the last octave of low frequency response increases size and expense considerably, and is increasingly uneconomic to attempt at high levels as in a PA application. A home stereo woofer, because it is used at relatively low volumes, may be able to handle very low frequencies. Because of this, most PA woofers are not well suited to use in high quality high fidelity home applications, and vice versa.

== Frequency ranges ==
At ordinary sound pressure levels, most humans can hear down to about 20 Hz. To accurately reproduce the lowest tones, a woofer, or group of woofers, must move an appropriately large volume of air — a task that becomes more difficult at lower frequencies. The larger the room, the more air the woofer's movement will have to displace in order to produce the required sound power at low frequencies.

== See also ==
- Loudspeaker enclosure
- Audio crossover
- Full-range speaker
- Tweeter
- Super tweeter
- Midrange speaker
- Subwoofer
- Thiele/Small
- Motional Feedback
