= Soft dome tweeter =

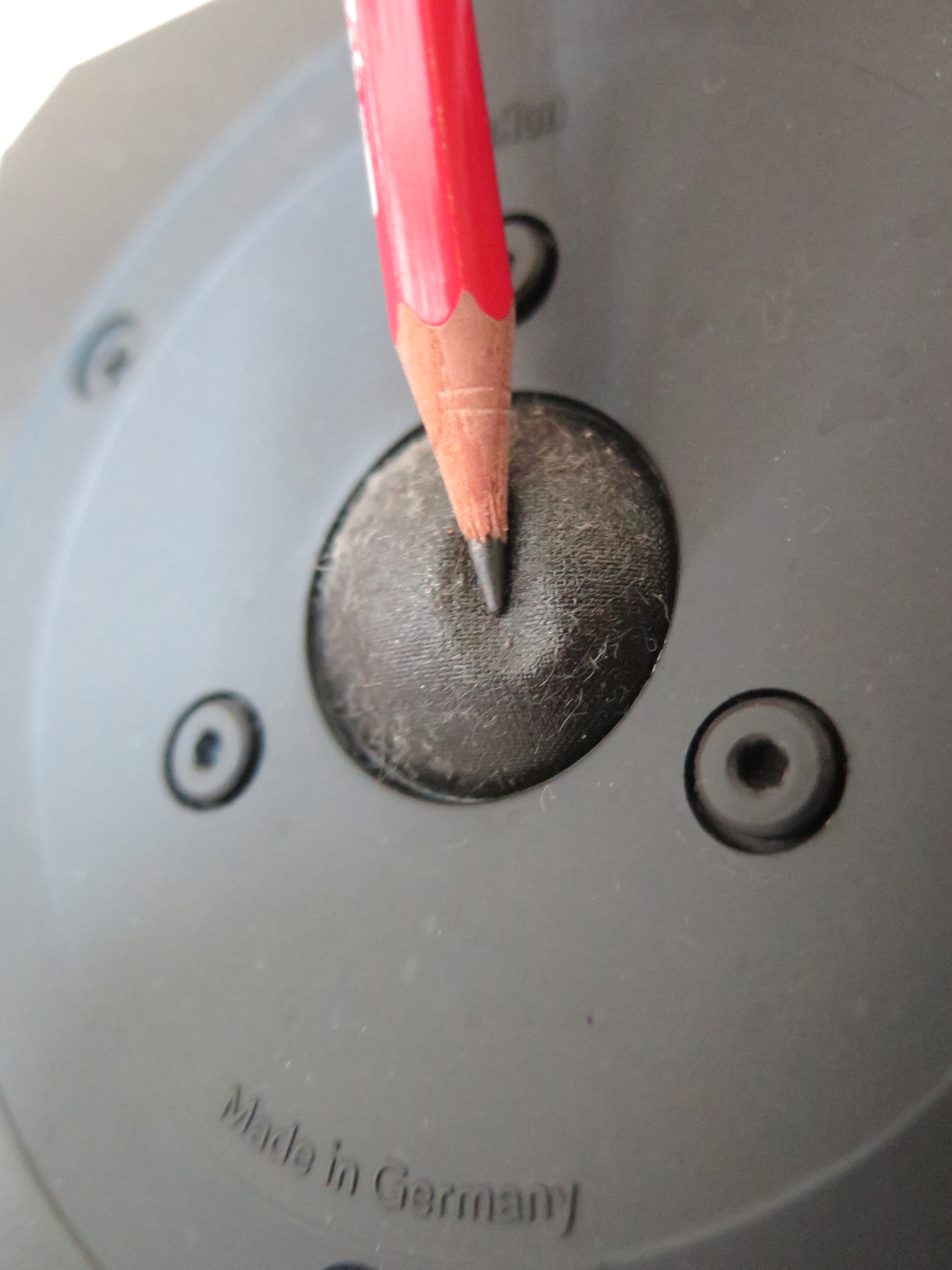
Soft dome tweeters can be indented without taking damage

The soft dome tweeter is a particular type of tweeter invented and patented in 1967 by Bill Hecht, a renowned pioneer in the early days of audio engineering and the founder of Phase Technology.

Hecht states that he was confronted with what seemed a mundane problem: When showing speakers at various audio shows, onlookers often poked at the two-inch dome tweeters of the display models, sometimes cracking them. He set out to make a soft, mock tweeter that wouldn't crack when prodded.

“I brought it back to the lab, and I thought it might possibly make a good mid-range if I coated it,” Hecht recalls. “So I coated it with a thin rubber coating and put noise through it with a signal generator. To my absolute surprise, it went beyond 12K; that was quite a shock.”

Prior to the soft dome tweeter, the belief was that only a rigid tweeter was capable of producing high frequencies. The soft dome revolutionized the reproduction of high frequency sound; it produced a smoother frequency response, wider dispersion to higher frequencies, and had almost no high frequency resonances, all with much lower distortion than conventional tweeters up to that point. After it was patented, the soft dome tweeter became an industry standard and was licensed almost immediately by all major audio companies in the world including Philips, Peerless, McIntosh, Sony, JVC, Yamaha, Pioneer, Kenwood, Shure and many more.
