= Super tweeter =

A super tweeter is a speaker driver intended to produce ultra-high frequencies in a multi-driver loudspeaker system. Its purpose is to recreate a more realistic sound field, often characterized as "airy-ness". Super tweeters are sometimes found in high fidelity speaker systems and sometimes even in home theater systems. They are used to supplement the sound of tweeters by reproducing frequencies which the tweeter may produce only with a narrow polar output, or perhaps with distortion.

A super tweeter is generally designed to respond well into ultrasonic frequencies over 20 kHz, the commonly accepted upper frequency limit of human hearing. Super tweeters have been designed for psychoacoustic testing, for extended-range digital audio such as high-resolution audio intended for audiophiles, for biologists performing research on animal response to sounds, and for ambient sound systems in zoos. Ribbon tweeters have been made that can reproduce 80 kHz and even 100 kHz.

== See also ==
- Loudspeaker
- Loudspeaker enclosure
- Audio crossover
- Full-range speaker
- Tweeter
- Midrange speaker
- Woofer
- Subwoofer
