= Motional Feedback =

Motional Feedback (MFB) is an active high fidelity loudspeaker system which was developed by the Dutch Philips brand in the early 1970s. The loudspeakers have built-in amplifiers and feature a feedback sensor on the woofer. The sensor measures the output signal of the woofer and compares it to the amplifier input signal. This results in very low distortion, as any distortion induced by the enclosure or the woofer itself is immediately corrected by the feedback loop. This low distortion also allows for extended low frequency response in a relatively small enclosure. To a degree, the sensor-feedback system also compensates for non-optimal room acoustics.

Although the Motional Feedback technology had been experimented with for several years, such as G.H. Brodie's 1958 patent on a feedback system using capacitive sensors, Philips was the first company to successfully create a working prototype and create a commercial product line of loudspeakers and equipment, starting with the RH541. The product manager of the Philips High Fidelity group, Piet Gouw, was responsible for the launch of most of the Motional Feedback loudspeakers and other high fidelity equipment. Today, at the age of 86, Gouw is an active member of MFBfreaks.com, the home of Motional Feedback collectors. He shares historical stories and answers questions on the forum.

Today, Motional Feedback is used by high-end audio designers. Grimm Audio / Tentlabs have developed the Pro-ls1s-dmf, a digital motional feedback subwoofer which, according to the company, lowers low frequency distortion by 30dB.

A commercial product aimed at the end-consumer market is developed and build by Dutch Archidio, and uses the same technology as the original Philips implementation.
