= Mid-range speaker =

Loudspeaker driver

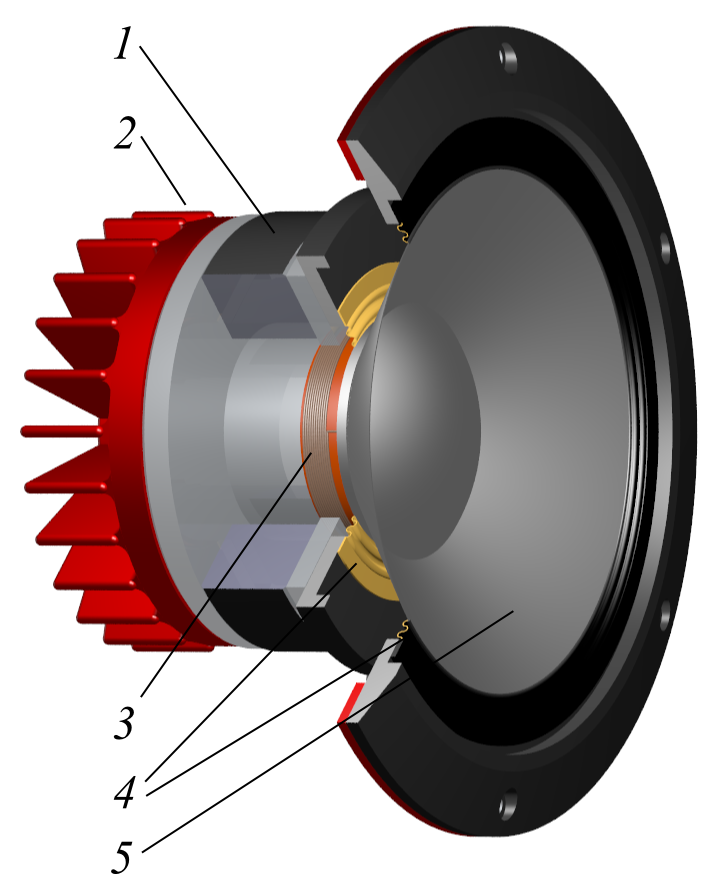
Cutaway view of a dynamic mid-range speaker: 1. Magnet; 2. Cooler; 3. Voicecoil; 4. Suspension; 5. Membrane

A mid-range speaker is a loudspeaker driver that reproduces sound in the frequency range from 200 to 2,000 Hz.

Mid-range drivers are usually cone types or, less commonly, dome types, or compression horn drivers. The radiating diaphragm of a cone mid-range unit is a truncated cone, with a voice coil attached at the neck, along with the spider portion of the suspension, and with the cone surround at the wide end. Cone mid-range drivers typically resemble small woofers. The most common material used for mid-range cones is paper, occasionally impregnated and/or surface-treated with polymers or resins in order to improve vibrational damping. Other mid-range cone materials include plastics such as polypropylene, Cobex, Bextrene, woven Kevlar, fiberglass, carbon fiber, or light metal alloys based on aluminium, magnesium, titanium, or other alloys. The radiating surface of a dome mid-range is typically a 90-degree section of a sphere, made from cloth, metal, or plastic film, with its suspension and voice coil co-located at the outer edge of the dome. Most professional concert mid-range drivers are compression drivers coupled to horns. A very few mid-ranges are electrostatic drivers, planar magnetic drivers, or ribbon drivers.

A mid-range driver is called upon to handle the most significant part of the audible sound spectrum, the region where the most fundamental frequencies are emitted by musical instruments, and, most importantly, the human voice. This region contains most sounds that are the most familiar to the human ear, and where discrepancies from faithful reproduction are most easily observed. It is therefore paramount that a mid-range driver of good quality be capable of low-distortion reproduction.

Many television sets and small radios, especially AM receivers, have only a single mid-range driver, or two for stereo sound. Some mid to high-end TV sets include a larger woofer. With human speech being the most important aspect of television audio and AM radio, it works out well. Since the ear is most sensitive to the middle frequencies produced by a mid-range driver and amplifier, both can be low power, while still delivering what is perceived to be good sound, both in terms of volume and quality.

Many laptops and smartphones are also small radios, have only a single mid-range speaker, or two mid-range speakers for stereo sound.

== Installation issues ==
Mid-range drivers are usually used in three-way multi-driver speaker systems. There are, therefore, special considerations involved in the acoustic join between the mid-range and both the low frequency (woofers) and the high frequency drivers (tweeters). The nature of the drivers on both sides of the mid-range, and the mid-range itself, affects the selection of crossover frequency and slope. Nearly all crossovers are passive circuits, designed to match the characteristics of the drivers and their mounting, and are built of capacitors, inductors, and resistors. Active or 'electronic' crossovers are used in some high-performance hi-fi speakers, and in professional sound reinforcement systems.

Placement of the mid-range (and tweeter) drivers on the enclosure baffle significantly affects the output of the driver, and the material surrounding the mid-range and tweeter drivers on the baffle can produce (or inhibit) reflections of energy from the baffle face, or other items, further influencing the output. Grilles, especially those with structural frames, can further modify the output of the entire speaker system. One of the terms used in design circles to describe some of these diffraction and reflection artifacts is the baffle step effect.

When a mid-range speaker is mounted in the same box as a woofer, it will have its own small sub-enclosure, or a sealed back, to prevent the woofer's backwave radiation into the box from affecting the mid-range's cone or dome motion.

== See also ==
- Loudspeaker
- Loudspeaker enclosure
- Audio crossover
- Full-range speaker
- Tweeter
- Super tweeter
- Woofer
- Subwoofer
