= Full-range speaker =

Type of loudspeaker

Cross-section of a full-range loudspeaker driver using a whizzer cone design.

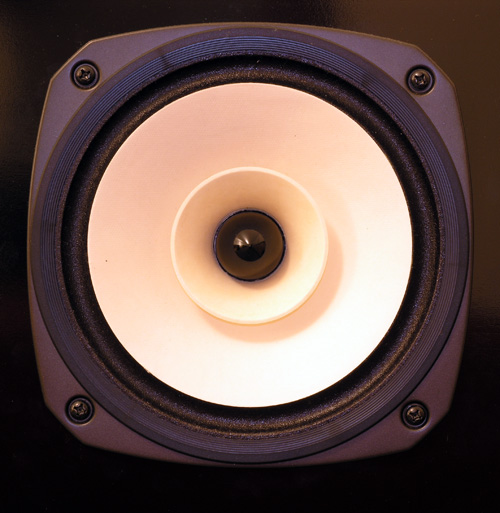
Fostex FE206e (modified) full range drive unit using a whizzer cone.

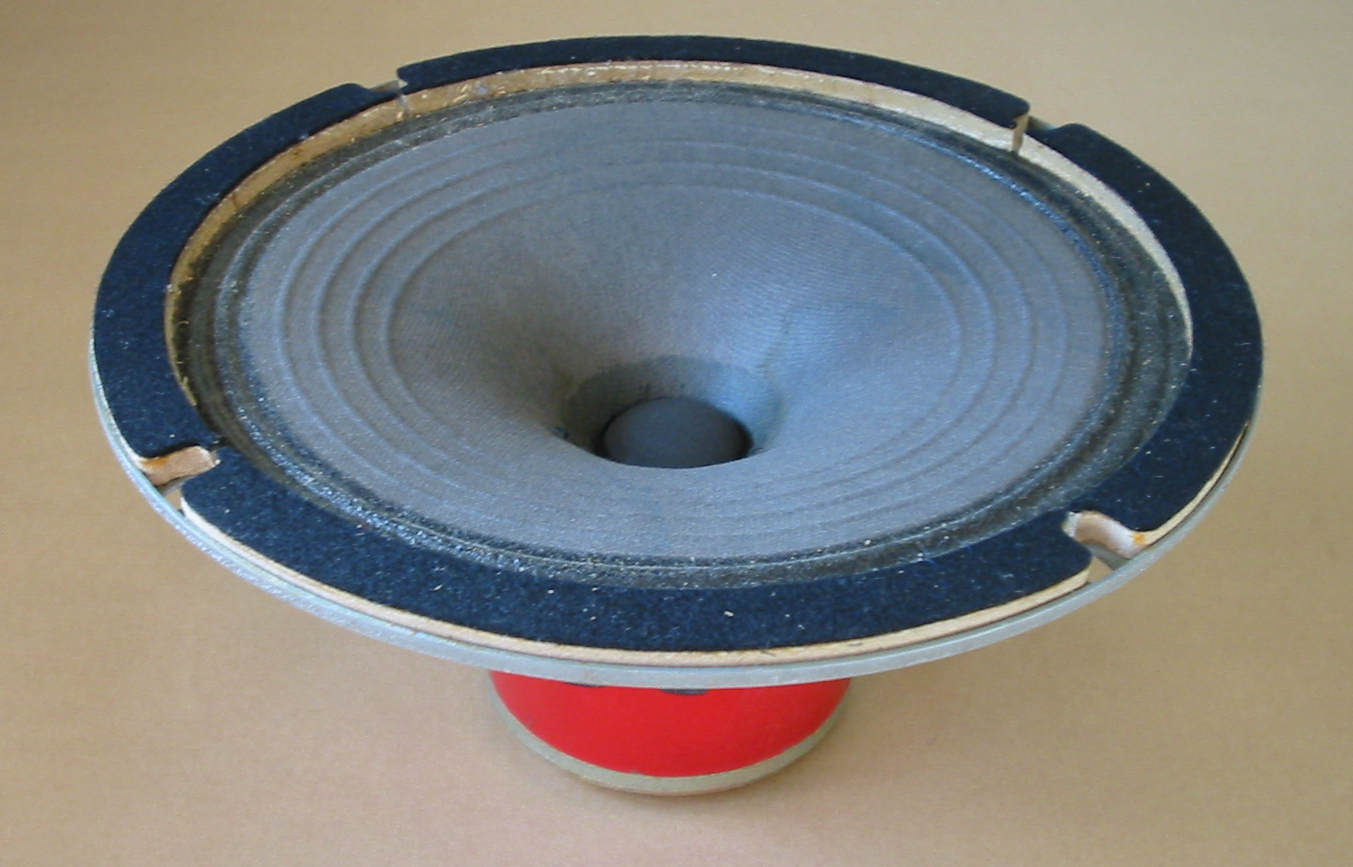
Goodmans Axiette, one of the first single-cone full-range drivers.

A full-range loudspeaker drive unit is defined as a driver which accepts and reproduces as much of the audible frequency range (20 Hz to 20 kHz) as possible, within the limitations imposed by the physical constraints of a specific design. The frequency range of these drivers is maximized through the use of a whizzer cone and other means. Most single driver systems, such as those in radios, or small computer speaker designs, cannot reproduce all of the audible frequencies or the entire audible audio range (i.e., sound within the range of human hearing).

== Typical designs ==
Typically, a full-range drive unit consists of a single driver element, or voice coil, used to move and control a diaphragm. Often the cone structure includes optimizations to enhance high-frequency performance. For example, a small low-mass horn or whizzer cone can be mounted where the voice coil and diaphragm meet, thereby increasing the output at high frequencies. The shape and materials used in the cone and whizzer are highly optimized. Manufacturers strive to optimize the materials, design, and construction of each component to achieve optimal performance and audio fidelity. Advanced technologies such as neodymium magnets, voice coil cooling systems, and wave guides further enhance the speakers’ capabilities, ensuring accurate sound reproduction and minimizing distortion. However, a full-range speaker, even with whizzer cone and bass reflex, usually still has audio attenuation for frequency lower than 100 Hz and higher than 10 KHz.

Another arrangement uses a radiating dome in place of the usual dust-cap; it is acoustically active. In most speaker drivers such dust-caps are constructed so as to be relatively acoustically inert. Sometimes the dust-cap takes the form of a small conical shape, claimed to improve dispersion at higher frequencies. Yet other designs simply modify the diaphragm and dome/whizzer materials instead of compliantly coupling the diaphragm to achieve full-range operation.

In some designs, the main diaphragm may be coupled to the voice coil using a compliant bond such that high frequency vibrations are not transmitted into it, but instead move the whizzer cone. The technique of using a compliantly coupled (or modified) diaphragm for the low frequencies and auxiliary whizzer or modified dust-cap (dome) for the high frequency response of a speaker is a mechanical implementation of an audio crossover.

Since the requirements of a full-range driver include both good low and high frequency response (which are contradictory in terms of physical construction), a full-range driver is usually limited to covering the audio spectrum above perhaps 100 Hz—leaving lower frequencies to be handled / augmented by a separate sub woofer or by a special cabinet design for low frequency reinforcement. These requirements usually mean that the full-range must have good sensitivity (for lower frequencies) with a light voice coil (for high frequencies) – these speakers commonly use a larger or more powerful magnet than usual, which improves sensitivity and thus lowers the power requirement at low frequencies as well as allowing a lighter voice coil. In addition, many have limited maximum excursions, requiring special enclosures which do not require large excursions at low frequencies for reasonable low end output.

There are rare exceptions that use multiple elements to drive a common diaphragm, but these should not be confused with coaxial speakers that use separate and concentrically aligned elements to achieve the desired range of reproduction, and are not, strictly, classified as full-range drivers.

Full-range drivers are seen in applications ranging from televisions and computer speakers, to hi-fi speaker systems. The performance of the driver is substantially affected by their enclosure, and enclosures vary from mundane beige plastic boxes, at the low end of the scale, to large horn loaded enclosures with spectacular audio performance.

== Atypical designs ==
A German company, Manger, produces an unusual full-range driver in the form of a differentially flexing flat diaphragm driver, about eight inches in diameter. Manger claims performance, both maximum level and extended low frequency response, which is rather better than traditional full-range drivers.

Another unusual full-range driver design is the Walsh driver, popularized in Ohm hi-fi speaker systems, where they reproduced almost the entire audible range of frequencies. Early Walsh units were large and expensive. These drivers used a single cone made with paper at the base, reproducing low frequencies, aluminium in the middle area, and titanium at the neck zone, to produce high frequencies. Slits in the paper area of the cone, covered with silicone damping, together with internal foam pads provided mechanisms for tailoring the frequency response to be as flat as possible. Loudspeakers using the Walsh driver are still in production, though they have adopted a tweeter so no longer qualify as full-range drivers.

A variation on the Walsh driver from a company called German Physiks, based in Maintal near Frankfurt, is available in two forms. One uses a cone made from titanium foil 0.025 mm thick and an improved version that uses 0.15 mm thick carbon fibre. These are used in their range of audiophile loudspeakers.

Large electrostatic loudspeakers may be considered as full-range speakers in the sense that they are capable of reproducing most of the audio frequency band.

== Applications ==
Full-range drive units may be found in applications ranging from inexpensive multimedia loudspeakers to more costly esoteric systems, the latter often using large transmission line or horn loaded enclosures to increase low frequency output. There is an active hobbyist speaker construction group on the Web focusing on full-range drivers and enclosures for them.

Since every electronic, mechanical or acoustical component in reproduction chain will, regardless of purpose, degrade fine detail, the fewer components between the amplifier terminals and the listening room, the better. This includes conventional "mid-kilohertz" crossovers, which, in addition, destroy the natural integrity of the harmonic structure by the abrupt severance of the harmonics from the fundamental frequencies. These problems are avoided with the single cone moving coil driver which is to loudspeakers as the wheel is to the car.

— Edward James Jordan, interviewed by TNT-Audio

== Commercial applications ==
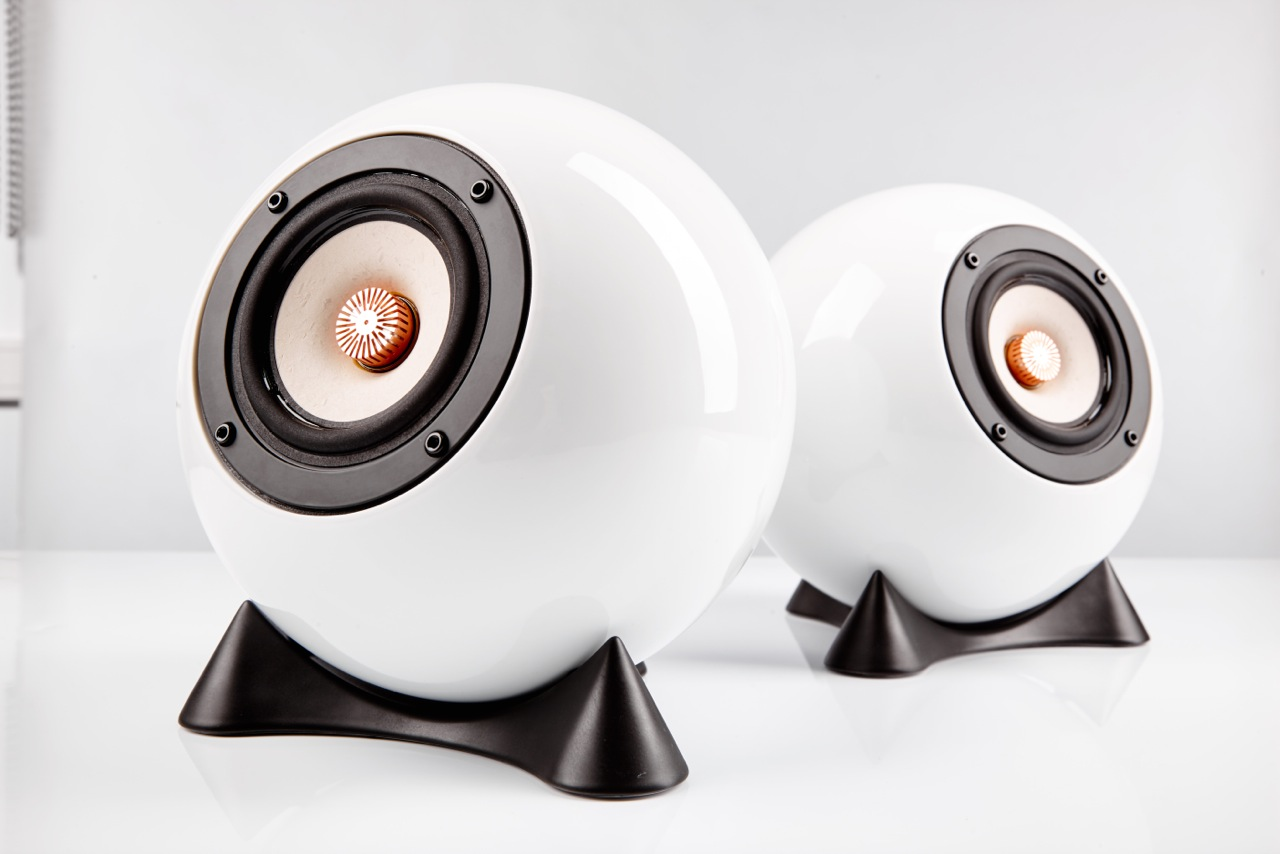
Spherical Speaker with single driver

A large number of full-range drive units are used in commercial sound systems, which may employ a number of 200 mm (8") full-range drivers, mounted into suspended ceilings or small 'back-box' enclosures. These convey background music and announcements to workers and visitors in retail stores, and public spaces. While these drivers are classed as 'full-range', it may be more accurate to term them 'wide-range' drivers, since their output abilities rarely extend to the extremes of the frequency range. Several manufacturers build small (typically 115 mm (4.5")) diameter full-range drivers into miniature enclosures, and many of these include 25 or 70-volt line transformers, for use on commercial sound systems employing long speaker cables. Some full-range speaker systems are designed with limited-range drivers, and must be used with equalizers to flatten and extend their frequency response, while others achieve acceptable response without electronic assistance. There are full-range speaker systems using up to 15" single drivers.

== Critical reaction ==
Critics of full range drivers cite their inability to reproduce the full range of audio frequencies at similar amplitudes, leading to inaccurate reproduction of the audio signal sent to it. Reproducing multiple frequencies with the same diaphragm can increase intermodulation distortion, a non-linear effect that occurs when one surface attempts to reproduce both frequencies simultaneously. The audible severity of modest intermodulation distortion is not well established. The result is a degree of "frequency mixing", albeit at a relatively low level. A full range driver may have reduced output at both ends of its frequency range, or a more severely limited frequency response, resulting in a more compromised sound. Partisans of full-range loudspeakers claim superior phase coherence, while some critics describe them as midrange speakers working at or beyond their limits. Some full range drivers have been developed using 12" and 15" drivers, e.g. Audio Nirvana, and have overcome the bass limitations of smaller drivers using bass reflex cabinets. Also, as most adults cannot hear above 15 kHz the lack of high end frequency is generally not an issue with modern well designed full range drivers.

== See also ==
- Loudspeaker enclosure
- Audio crossover
- High-pass filter
- Low-pass filter
- Tweeter
- Super tweeter
- Midrange speaker
- Woofer
- Subwoofer
- Psychoacoustics
- Bass reflex
- Passive radiator (speaker)
