= Tweeter =

Type of loudspeaker

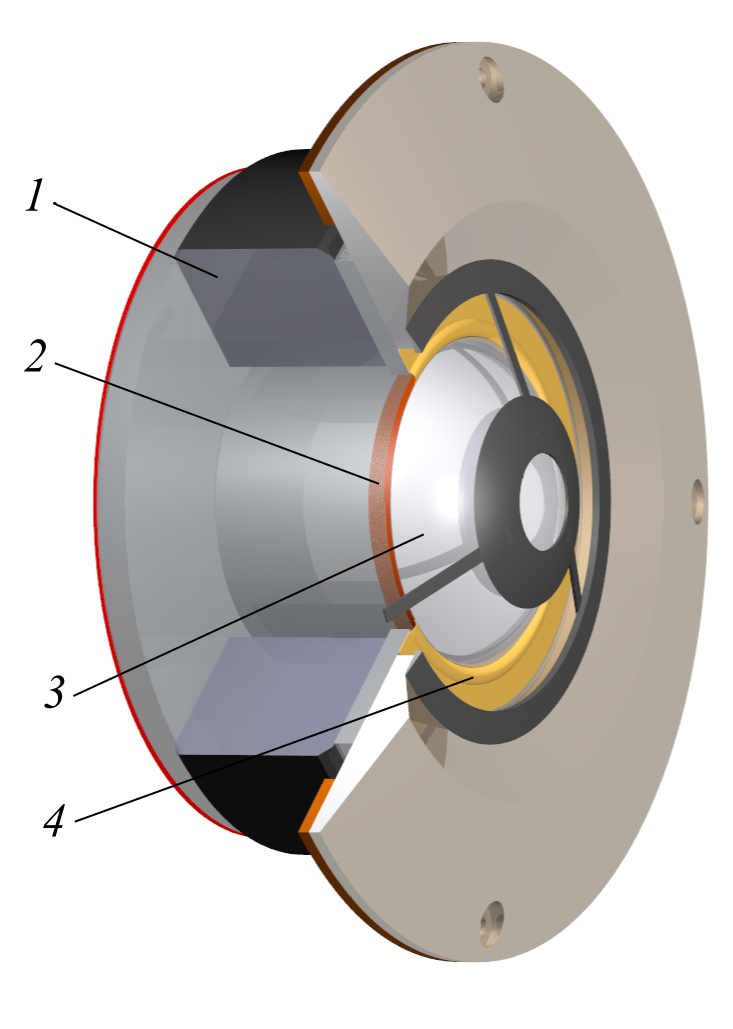
Cutaway view of a dynamic tweeter with acoustic lens and a dome-shaped membrane.: 1. Magnet; 2. Voicecoil; 3. Membrane; 4. Suspension

A tweeter or treble speaker is a special type of loudspeaker (usually dome, inverse dome or horn-type) that is designed to produce high audio frequencies, typically from 2,000 to 20,000 Hz. The name is derived from the high pitched sounds made by some birds (tweets), especially in contrast to the low woofs made by many dogs, after which low-frequency drivers are named (woofers).

== Operation ==
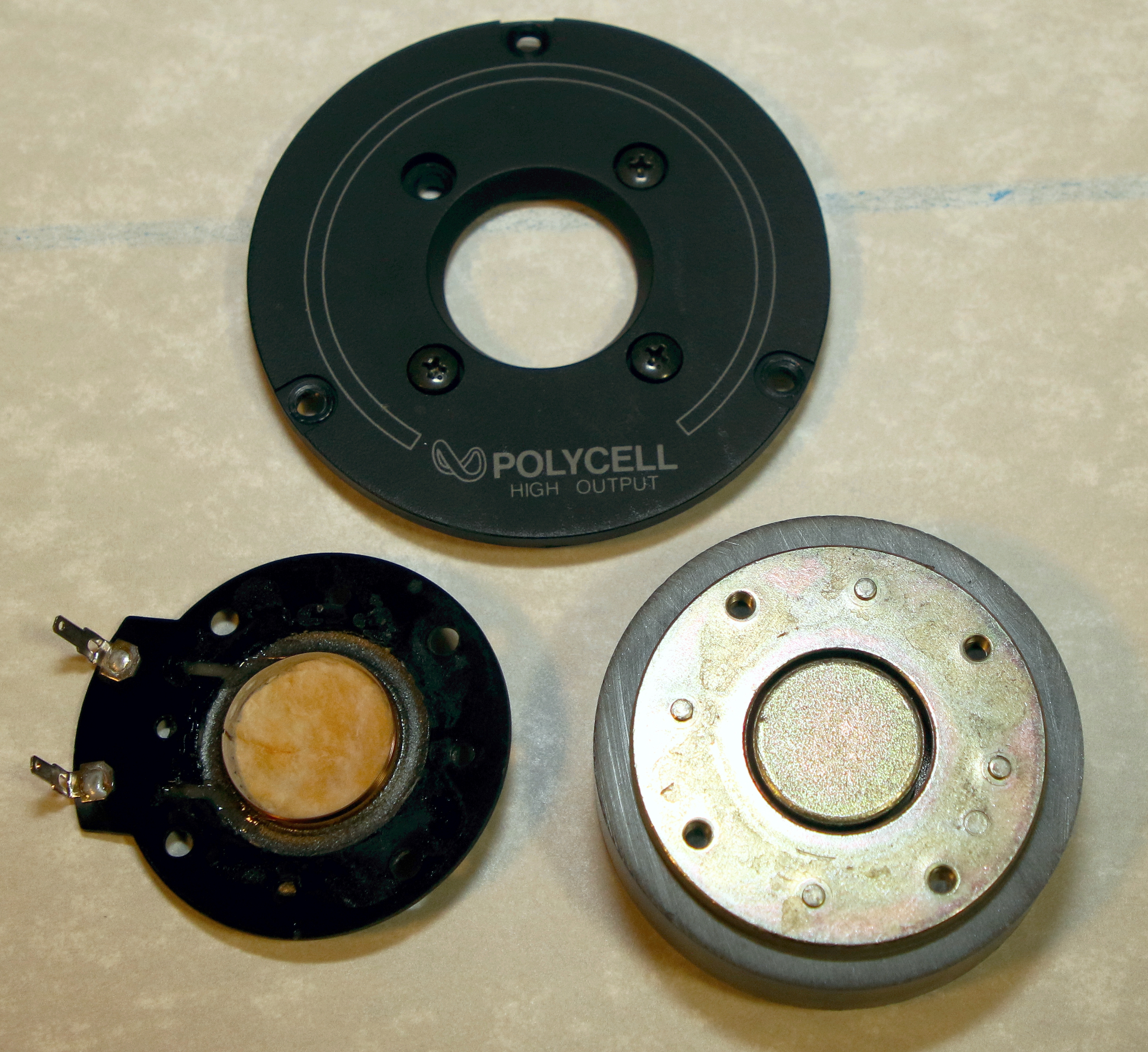
Polycell tweeter from an Infinity speaker, showing the components

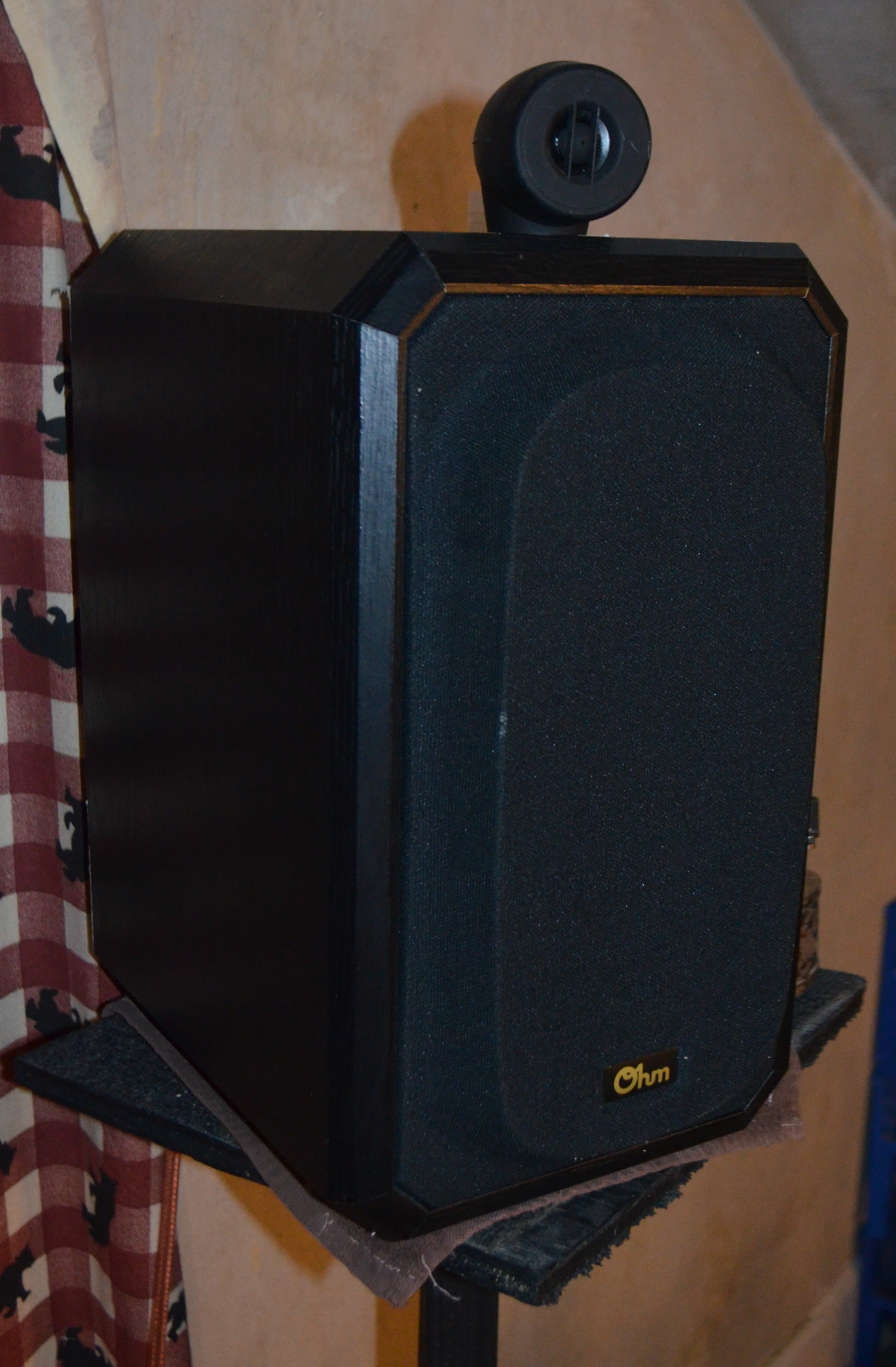
Ohm CAM 16 speaker with "egg tweeter"

Nearly all tweeters are electrodynamic drivers using a voice coil suspended within a fixed magnetic field. These designs operate by applying current from the output of an amplifier circuit to a coil of wire called a voice coil. The voice coil produces a varying magnetic field, which works against the fixed magnetic field of a permanent magnet around which the cylindrical voice coil is suspended, forcing the voice coil and the diaphragm attached to it to move. This mechanical movement resembles the waveform of the electronic signal supplied from the amplifier's output to the voice coil. Since the coil is attached to a diaphragm, the vibratory motion of the voice coil transmits to the diaphragm; the diaphragm in turn vibrates the air, thus creating air motions or audio waves, which is heard as high sounds.

Modern tweeters are typically different from older tweeters, which were usually small versions of woofers. As tweeter technology has advanced, different design applications have become popular. Many soft dome tweeter diaphragms are thermoformed from polyester film, or silk or polyester fabric that has been impregnated with a polymer resin. Hard dome tweeters are usually made of aluminium, aluminium-magnesium alloys, or titanium.

Tweeters are intended to convert an electrical signal into mechanical air movement with nothing added or subtracted, but the process is imperfect, and real-world tweeters involve tradeoffs. Among the challenges in tweeter design and manufacture are: providing adequate damping, to stop the dome's motion rapidly when the signal ends; ensuring suspension linearity, allowing high output at the low end of its frequency range; ensuring freedom from contact with the magnet assembly, keeping the dome centered as it moves; and providing adequate power handling without adding excessive mass. Tweeters contribute to a well-balanced and rich audio experience by focusing on the higher sound frequencies.

Tweeters can also work in collaboration with the woofers that are responsible for generating the low frequencies or bass.

Some tweeters sit outside the main enclosure in their own semi-independent unit, such as "super tweeters". The latter plugs in and swivels to adjust the soundfield depending on listener position and user preference. The separation from the baffle is considered to be optimal under the theory that the smallest baffle possible is optimal for tweeters.

== Range ==
Most tweeters are designed to reproduce frequencies up to the formally defined upper limit of the human hearing range (typically listed as 20 kHz); some operate at frequencies up to approximately in between 2 kHz to 20 kHz. Tweeters with a greater upper range have been designed for psychoacoustic testing, for extended-range digital audio such as Super Audio CD intended for audiophiles, for biologists performing research on animal response to sounds, and for ambient sound systems in zoos. Ribbon tweeters have been made that can reproduce 80 kHz and even 100 kHz.

== Dome materials ==
All dome materials have advantages and disadvantages. Three properties designers look for in domes are low mass, high stiffness and good damping. Celestion were the first manufacturers to fabricate dome tweeters out of a metal, copper. Nowadays other metals such as aluminium, titanium, magnesium, and beryllium, as well as various alloys thereof, are used, being both light and stiff but having low damping; their resonant modes occur above 20 kHz. More exotic materials, such as synthetic diamond, are also being used for their extreme stiffness. Polyethylene terephthalate film and woven silk suffer less ringing, but are not nearly as stiff, which can limit their very high frequency output.

In general, smaller dome tweeters provide wider dispersion of sound at the highest frequencies. However, smaller dome tweeters have less radiating area, which limits their output at the lower end of their range; and they have smaller voice coils, which limit their overall power output.

== Ferrofluid ==
Ferrofluid is a suspension of very small (typically 10 nm) iron oxide magnetic particles in a very low volatility liquid, typically a synthetic oil. A wide range of viscosity and magnetic density variants allow designers to add damping, cooling, or both. Ferrofluid also aids in centering the voice coil in the magnetic gap, reducing distortion. The fluid is typically injected into the magnetic gap and is held in place by the strong magnetic field. If a tweeter has been subjected to elevated power levels, some thickening of the ferrofluid occurs, as a portion of the carrier liquid evaporates. In extreme cases, this can degrade the sound quality and output level of a tweeter, and the fluid must be removed and new fluid installed.

== Professional sound applications ==
Tweeters designed for sound reinforcement and musical instrument applications are broadly similar to high fidelity tweeters, though they are usually not referred to as tweeters, but rather as "high frequency drivers". Key design requirement differences are: mountings built for repeated shipping and handling, drivers often mounted to horn structures to provide for higher sound levels and greater control of sound dispersion, and more robust voice coils to withstand the higher power levels typically encountered. High frequency drivers in PA horns are often referred to as "compression drivers" from the mode of acoustic coupling between the driver diaphragm and the horn throat.

Various materials are used in the construction of compression driver diaphragms including titanium, aluminium, phenolic impregnated fabric, polyimide and PET film, each having its own characteristics. The diaphragm is glued to a voice coil former, typically made from a different material from the dome, since it must cope with heat without tearing or significant dimensional change. Polyimide film, Nomex, and glassfibre are popular for this application. The suspension may be a continuation of the diaphragm and is glued to a mounting ring, which may fit into a groove, over locating pins, or be fastened with machine screws. The diaphragm is generally shaped like an inverted dome and loads into a series of tapered channels in a central structure called a phase plug, which equalizes the path length between various areas of the diaphragm and the horn throat, preventing acoustic cancellations between different points on the diaphragm surface. The phase plug exits into a tapered tube, which forms the start of the horn itself. This slowly expanding throat within the driver is continued in the horn flare. The horn flare controls the coverage pattern, or directivity, and as an acoustic transformer, adds gain. A professional horn and compression driver combination has an output sensitivity of between 105 and 112 dB/watt/meter. This is substantially more efficient (and less thermally dangerous to a small voice coil and former) than other tweeter construction.

== Types of tweeters ==
=== Cone tweeter ===
The cone tweeter from a Marantz 5G loudspeaker

Cone tweeters have the same basic design and form as a woofer with optimizations to operate at higher frequencies. The optimizations usually are:

- a very small and light cone so it can move rapidly;
- cone materials chosen for stiffness (e.g., ceramic cones in one manufacturer's line), or good damping properties (e.g., paper, silk or coated fabric) or both;
- a suspension (or spider) that is stiffer than for other drivers—less flexibility is needed for high frequency reproduction;
- small voice coils (3/4 inch is typical) and light (thin) wire, which also helps the tweeter cone move rapidly.

Cone tweeters were popular in older stereo hi-fi speakers designed and manufactured in the 1960s and 1970s as an alternative to the dome tweeter (which was developed in the late 1950s). Cone tweeters today are often relatively cheap, but many of those in the past were of high quality, such as those made by Audax/Polydax, Bozak, CTS, JBL, Tonegen and SEAS. These vintage cone tweeters exhibited very flat frequency response, low distortion, fast transient response, a low resonance frequency and a gentle low-end roll-off, easing crossover design.

Typical of the 1960s/1970s-era was the CTS "phenolic ring" cone tweeters, exhibiting flat response from 2,000 to 15,000 Hz, low distortion and fast transient response. The CTS "phenolic ring" tweeter gets its name from the orange-colored edge suspension ring that it has which is made from phenolic. It was used in many makes and models of well-regarded vintage speakers, and was a mid-priced unit.

Cone tweeters have a narrower dispersion characteristic that is the same as a cone woofer's. Many designers therefore believed this made them a good match to cone midranges and woofers, allowing for superb stereo imaging. However, the "sweet spot" created by the narrow dispersion of cone tweeters is small. Speakers with cone tweeters offered the best stereo imaging when positioned in the room's corners, a common practice in the 1950s, 1960s and early 1970s.

During the 1970s and 1980s, the widespread introduction of higher quality audiophile discs and the advent of the CD caused the cone tweeter to fall out of popularity because cone tweeters seldom extend higher than 15 kHz. Audiophiles felt that cone tweeters lacked the "airiness" of dome tweeters or other types. Nevertheless, many high-end cone tweeters remained in limited production by Audax, JBL and SEAS until the mid-1980s.

Cone tweeters are now rarely used in modern hi-fi usage and are routinely seen in low cost applications such as factory car speakers, compact stereo systems, and boom boxes. Some boutique speaker manufacturers recently have returned to high-end cone tweeters, especially recreations of CTS phenolic ring models, to create a vintage-sounding product.

=== Dome tweeter ===
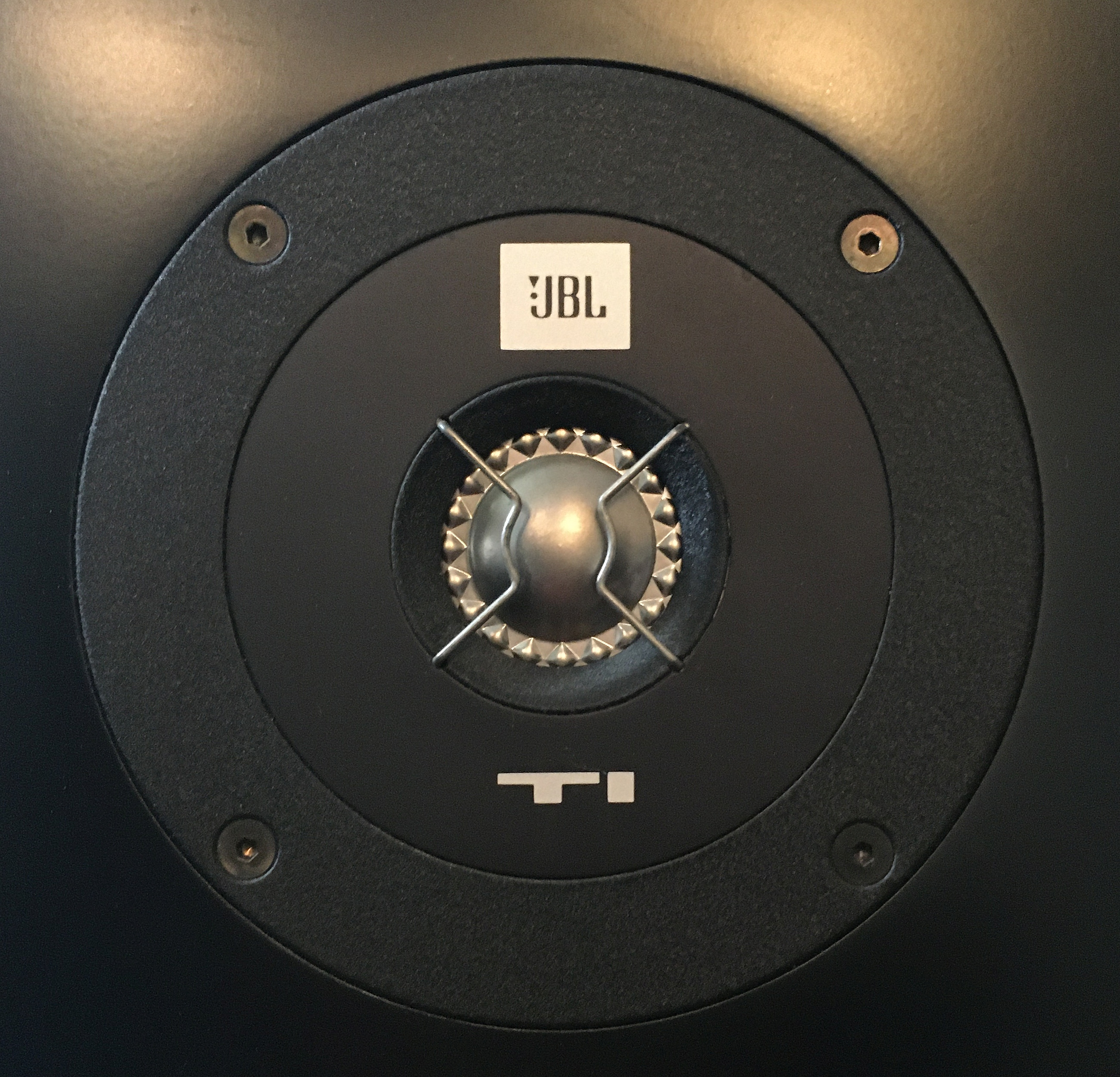
Dome tweeter with a membrane with 25 mm diameter made from titanium; from a JBL TI 5000 loudspeaker box, c. 1997

A dome tweeter is constructed by attaching a voice coil to a dome (made of woven fabric, thin metal or other suitable material), which is attached to the magnet or the top plate via a low compliance suspension. These tweeters typically do not have a frame or basket, but a simple front plate attached to the magnet assembly. Dome tweeters are categorized by their voice coil diameter, and range from 19 mm (0.75 in), through 38 mm (1.5 in). The overwhelming majority of dome tweeters presently used in hi-fi speakers are 25 mm (1 in) in diameter.

A variation is the ring radiator in which the 'suspension' of the cone or dome becomes the major radiating element. These tweeters have different directivity characteristics when compared to standard dome tweeters.

=== Piezo tweeter ===
A piezo (or piezo-electric) tweeter contains a piezoelectric crystal coupled to a mechanical diaphragm. An audio signal is applied to the crystal, which responds by flexing in proportion to the voltage applied across the crystal's surfaces, thus converting electrical energy into mechanical.

The conversion of electrical pulses to mechanical vibrations and the conversion of returned mechanical vibrations back into electrical energy is the basis for ultrasonic testing. The active element is the heart of the transducer as it converts the electrical energy to acoustic energy, and vice versa. The active element is basically a piece of polarized material (i.e. some parts of the molecule are positively charged, while other parts of the molecule are negatively charged) with electrodes attached to two of its opposite faces. When an electric field is applied across the material, the polarized molecules will align themselves with the electric field, resulting in induced dipoles within the molecular or crystal structure of the material. This alignment of molecules will cause the material to change dimensions. This phenomenon is known as electrostriction. In addition, a permanently polarized material such as quartz (SiO_{2}) or barium titanate (BaTiO_{3}) will produce an electric field when the material changes dimensions as a result of an imposed mechanical force. This phenomenon is known as the piezoelectric effect.

Piezo tweeters rarely get used in high-end audio because of their low fidelity, although they did feature in some high-end designs of the late ‘70s, such as the Celef PE1 in which they were utilised as a super tweeter in combination with a conventional dome tweeter. They are often used in toys, buzzers, alarms, bass guitar speaker cabinets, cheap computer or stereo speakers and PA horns.

=== Ribbon tweeter ===
A Philips ribbon tweeter

A ribbon tweeter uses a very thin diaphragm (often of aluminum, or perhaps metalized plastic film) that supports a planar coil frequently made by deposition of aluminium vapor, suspended in a powerful magnetic field (typically provided by neodymium magnets) to reproduce high frequencies. The development of ribbon tweeters has more or less followed the development of ribbon microphones. The ribbon is of very lightweight material and so capable of very high acceleration and extended high frequency response. Ribbons have traditionally been incapable of high output (large magnet gaps leading to poor magnetic coupling is the main reason). But higher power versions of ribbon tweeters are becoming common in large-scale sound reinforcement line array systems, which can serve audiences of thousands. They are attractive in these applications since nearly all ribbon tweeters inherently exhibit useful directional properties, with very wide horizontal dispersion (coverage) and very tight vertical dispersion. These drivers can easily be stacked vertically, building a high frequency line array that produces high sound pressure levels much farther away from the speaker locations than do conventional tweeters.

=== Planar magnetic tweeter ===
Some loudspeaker designers use a planar magnetic tweeter, sometimes called a quasi-ribbon. Planar magnetic tweeters are generally less expensive than true ribbon tweeters, but are not precisely equivalent as a metal foil ribbon is lighter than the diaphragm in a planar magnetic tweeter and the magnetic structures are different. Usually a thin piece of PET film or plastic with a voice coil wire running numerous times vertically on the material is used. The magnet structure is less expensive than for ribbon tweeters.

=== Electrostatic tweeter ===
A Shackman MHT85 Electrostatic Tweeter.

An electrostatic tweeter operates on the same principles as a full-range electrostatic speaker or a pair of electrostatic headphones. This type of speaker employs a thin diaphragm (generally plastic and typically PET film), with a thin conductive coating, suspended between two screens or perforated metal sheets, referred to as stators.

The output of the driving amplifier is applied to the primary of a step-up transformer with a center-tapped secondary, and a very high voltage—several hundred to several thousand volts—is applied between the center tap of the transformer and the diaphragm. Electrostatics of this type necessarily include a high voltage power supply to provide the high voltage used. The stators are connected to the remaining terminals of the transformer. When an audio signal is applied to the primary of the transformer, the stators are electrically driven 180 degrees out of phase, alternately attracting and repelling the diaphragm.

An uncommon way of driving an electrostatic speaker without a transformer is to connect the plates of a push-pull vacuum tube amplifier directly to the stators, and the high voltage supply between the diaphragm and ground.

Electrostatics have reduced even-order harmonic distortion because of their push-pull design. They also have minimal phase distortion. The design is quite old (the original patents date to the 1930s), but occupies a very small segment of the market because of high costs, low efficiency, large size for full range designs, and fragility.

=== AMT tweeter ===
The Air Motion Transformer tweeter works by pushing air out perpendicularly from the pleated diaphragm. Its diaphragm is the folded pleats of film (typically PET film) around aluminium struts held in a strong magnetic field. In past decades, ESS of California produced a series of hybrid loudspeakers using such tweeters, along with conventional woofers, referring to them as Heil transducers after their inventor, Oskar Heil. They are capable of considerable output levels and are rather more sturdy than electrostatics or ribbons, but have similar low-mass moving elements.

Most of the current AMT drivers in use today are similar in efficiency and frequency response to the original Oskar Heil designs of the 1970s.

=== Horn tweeter ===
A horn tweeter is any of the above tweeters coupled to a flared or horn structure. Horns are used for two purposes—to control dispersion, and to couple the tweeter diaphragm to the air for higher efficiency. The tweeter in either case is usually termed a compression driver and is quite different from more common types of tweeters (see above). Properly used, a horn improves the off-axis response of the tweeter by controlling (i.e., reducing) the directivity of the tweeter. It can also improve the efficiency of the tweeter by coupling the relatively high acoustic impedance of the driver to the lower impedance of the air. The larger the horn, the lower the frequencies at which it can work, since large horns provide coupling to the air at lower frequencies. There are different types of horns, including radial and constant directivity (CD). Horn tweeters may have a somewhat 'different' sonic signature than simple dome tweeters. Poorly designed horns, or improperly crossed-over horns, have predictable problems in the accuracy of their output, and the load that they present to the amplifier. Perhaps concerned about the image of poorly designed horns, some manufacturers use horn loaded tweeters, but avoid using the term. Their euphemisms include "elliptical aperture" "Semi-horn" and "Directivity controlled". These are, nonetheless, a form of horn loading.

=== Plasma or ion tweeter ===
Because ionized gas is electrically charged and so can be manipulated by a variable electrical field, it is possible to use a small sphere of plasma as a tweeter. Such tweeters are called a plasma tweeter or ion tweeter. They can be more complex than other tweeters (plasma generation is not required in other types), but offer the advantage that the moving mass is optimally low—if not relatively massless and so very responsive to the signal input. The early models of these tweeters were not capable of high output, nor of other than very high frequency reproduction, and so are usually used at the throat of a horn structure to manage usable output levels. One disadvantage is that the plasma arc can produce ozone and NOx, poison gases, in small quantities as a by-product. Because of this, German-made Magnat "magnasphere" speakers were banned from import to the United States in the 1980s. Any modern design uses catalysts to reduce the gas output to negligible quantities.

In the past, the dominant manufacturer in the US was DuKane near St Louis, who made the Ionovac; also sold in a UK variant as the Ionophone. Electro-Voice made a model for a short time under license along with DuKane from the inventor Siegfried Klein. These early models were finicky and required regular replacement of the cell in which the plasma was generated (the DuKane unit used a precision machined quartz cell). As a result, they were expensive units in comparison to other designs. Those who have heard the Ionovacs report that, in a sensibly designed loudspeaker system, the highs were 'airy' and very detailed, though high output wasn't possible.

In the 1980s, the Plasmatronics speaker also used a plasma tweeter, though the manufacturer did not stay in business very long and very few of these complex units were sold.

== See also ==
- Audio crossover
- Full-range speaker
- Loudspeaker enclosure
- Midrange speaker
- Plasma speaker
- Subwoofer
- Super tweeter
- Woofer
