= Voice coil =

Loudspeaker part

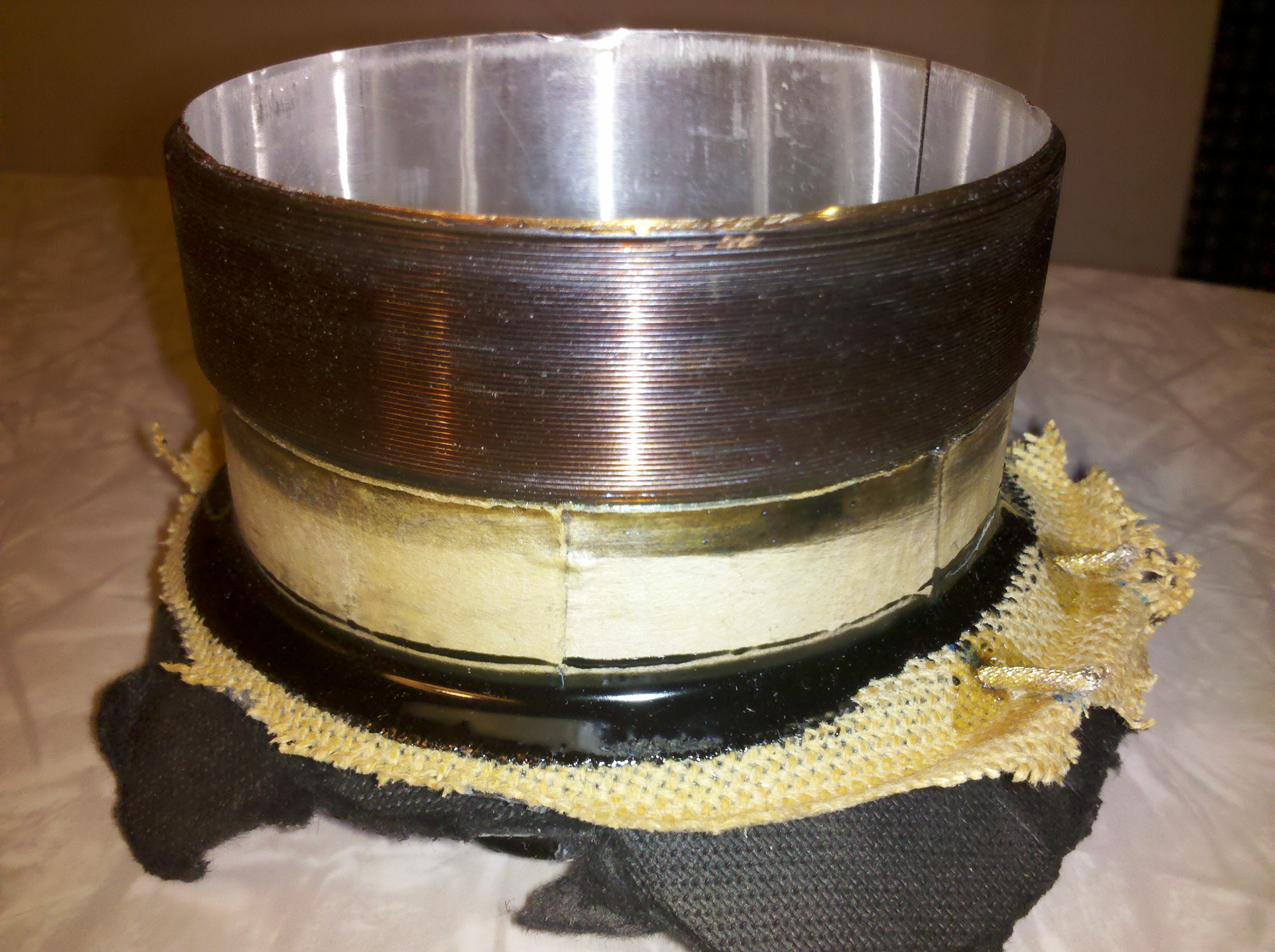
A 7.5 cm diameter dual voice coil from a subwoofer driver

A voice coil (consisting of a former, collar, and winding) is the coil of wire attached to the apex of a loudspeaker cone. It provides the motive force to the cone by the reaction of a magnetic field to the current passing through it.

The term is also used for voice coil linear motors such as those used to move the heads inside hard disk drives, which produce a larger force and move a longer distance but work on the same principle. In some applications, such as the operation of servo valves, electronic focus adjustment on digital cameras, these are known as voice coil motors (VCM).

== Operation ==
By driving a current through the voice coil, a magnetic field is produced. This magnetic field causes the voice coil to react to the magnetic field from a permanent magnet fixed to the speaker's frame, thereby moving the cone of the speaker. By applying an audio waveform to the voice coil, the cone will reproduce the sound pressure waves, corresponding to the original input signal.

== Design considerations ==
Because the moving parts of the speaker must be of low mass (to accurately reproduce high-frequency sounds without being damped too much by inertia), voice coils are usually made as light weight as possible, making them delicate. Passing too much current through the coil can cause it to overheat (see ohmic heating). Voice coils wound with flattened wire, called ribbon-wire, provide a higher packing density in the magnetic gap than coils with round wire. Some coils are made with surface-sealed bobbin and collar materials so they may be immersed in a ferrofluid which assists in cooling the coil, by conducting heat away from the coil and into the magnet structure. Excessive input power at low frequencies can cause the coil to move beyond its normal limits, causing distortion and possibly mechanical damage.

Power handling is related to the heat resistance of the wire insulation, adhesive, and bobbin material, and may be influenced by the coil's position within the magnetic gap. The majority of loudspeakers use 'overhung' voice coils, with windings that are taller than the height of the magnetic gap. In this topology, a portion of the coil remains within the gap at all times. The power handling is limited by the amount of heat that can be tolerated, and the amount that can be removed from the voice coil. Some magnet designs include aluminium heat-sink rings above and below the magnet gap, to improve conduction cooling, significantly improving power handling. If all other conditions remain constant, the area of the voice coil windings is proportional to the power handling of the coil. Thus a 100 mm diameter voice coil, with a 12 mm winding height has similar power handling to a 50 mm diameter voice coil with a 24 mm winding height.

In 'underhung' voice coil designs (see below), the coil is shorter than the magnetic gap, a topology that provides consistent electromotive force over a limited range of motion, known as X_{max}. If the coil is overdriven it may leave the gap, generating significant distortion and losing the heat-sinking benefit of the steel, heating rapidly.

Many hi-fi, and almost all professional low frequency loudspeakers (woofers) include vents in the magnet system to provide forced-air cooling of the voice coil. The pumping action of the cone and the dustcap draws in cool air and expels hot air. This method of cooling relies upon cone motion, so is ineffective at midrange or treble frequencies, although venting of midranges and tweeters does provide some acoustic advantages.

In the earliest loudspeakers, voice coils were wound onto paper bobbins, which was appropriate for modest power levels. As more powerful amplifiers became available, alloy 1145 aluminium foil was widely substituted for paper bobbins, and the voice coils survived increased power. Typical modern hi-fi loudspeaker voice coils employ materials which can withstand operating temperatures up to 150°C, or even 180°C. For professional loudspeakers, advanced thermoset composite materials are available to improve voice coil survival under severe simultaneous thermal (<300°C) and mechanical stresses.

Aluminium was widely used in the speaker industry due to its low cost, ease of bonding, and structural strength. When higher power amplifiers emerged, especially in professional sound, the limitations of aluminium were exposed. It rather efficiently but inconveniently transfers heat from the voice coil into the adhesive bonds of the loudspeaker, thermally degrading or even burning them. Motion of the aluminium bobbin in the magnetic gap creates eddy currents within the material, which further increase the temperature, hindering long-term survival. In 1955 DuPont developed Kapton, a polyimide plastic film which did not suffer from aluminium's deficiencies, so Kapton, and later Kaneka Apical were widely adopted for voice coils. As successful as these dark brown plastic films were for most hi-fi voice coils, they also had some less attractive properties, principally their cost, and an unfortunate tendency to soften when hot. Hisco P450, developed in 1992 to address the softening issue in professional speakers, is a thermoset composite of thin glassfibre cloth, impregnated with polyimide resin, combining the best characteristics of polyimide with the temperature resistance and stiffness of glassfibre. It withstands brutal physical stresses and operating temperatures up to 300°C, while its stiffness helps maintain the speaker's 'cold' frequency response.

The actual wire employed in voice coil winding is almost always copper, with an electrical insulation coating, and in some cases, an adhesive overcoat. Copper wire provides an easily manufactured, general purpose voice coil, at a reasonable cost. Where maximum sensitivity or extended high frequency response is required from a loudspeaker, aluminium wire may be substituted, to reduce the moving mass of the coil. While rather delicate in a manufacturing environment, aluminium wire has about one third of the mass of the equivalent gauge of copper wire, and has about two-thirds of the electrical conductivity. Copper-clad aluminium wire is occasionally used, allowing easier winding, along with a useful reduction in coil mass compared to copper.

Anodized aluminium flat wire may be used, providing an insulating oxide layer more resistant to dielectric breakdown than enamel coatings on other voice coil wire. This creates lightweight, low-inductance voice coils, ideally suited to use in small, extended range speakers. The principal power limitation on such coils is the thermal softening point of the adhesives which bond the wire to the bobbin, or the bobbin to the spider and coil.

Voice coils can be used for applications other than loudspeakers, where time force linearity and long strokes are needed. Some environments like vacuum or space require specific attention during conception, in order to evacuate coil losses. Several specific methods can be used to facilitate thermal drain.

== Overhung and underhung coils ==
Overhung and underhung voice coils. Light grey is soft iron, dark grey is permanent magnetic material and the coil is in red.

The image above shows two ways in which the voice coil is immersed in the magnetic field. The most common method is the overhung design where the height of the voice coil is greater than the magnetic gap's height. The underhung design which is used mostly in high-end speakers has the coil's height smaller than the gap's. The differences, advantages and disadvantages of both methods are listed below.

Overhung coil

- Coil height is greater than the gap's height.
- This method keeps the number of windings within the magnetic field (or flux) constant over the coil's normal excursion range.
- Higher coil mass, sensitivity low to medium.
- Soft non-linearity as the coil exceeds limits.

Underhung coil

- Gap's height is greater than the coil's height.
- This method keeps the magnetic flux that the coil experiences, constant over the coil's normal excursion range.
- Low coil mass, sensitivity medium to high.
- Hard non-linearity as the coil exceeds limits.

Both topologies attempt the same goal: linear force acting on the coil, for a driver that reproduces the applied signal faithfully.

== Other uses for the term ==
The term "voice coil" has been generalized and refers to any galvanometer-like mechanism that uses a solenoid to move an object back-and-forth within a magnetic field.

In particular, it is commonly used to refer to the coil of wire that moves the read–write heads in a moving-head disk drive. In this application, a very lightweight coil of wires is mounted within a strong magnetic field produced by permanent rare-earth magnets. The voice coil is the motor part of the servo system that positions the heads: an electric control signal drives the voice coil and the resulting force quickly and accurately positions the heads.

== See also ==
- Galvanometer
