= Speaker terminal =

Electrical connector used for connecting speakers to amplifiers

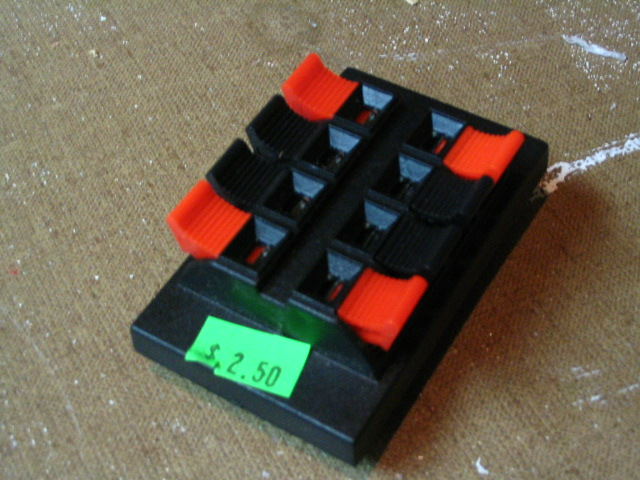
Easy push speaker grip connector terminal

A speaker terminal is a type of electrical connector often used for interconnecting speakers and audio power amplifiers.

The terminals are used in pairs, with each of the speaker cable's two wires being connected to one terminal in the pair. Since speaker connections are polarized, the terminals are typically color-coded so that the positive wire connects to the red and the negative to the black terminal.

Common types of speaker terminals include SpeakONs, Phoenix Connectors, Screw-on barrier strips, banana connectors, binding posts, TS jacks, TRS jacks, XLRs, combo jacks, and RCA stereos.

Another common type is speaker spring terminals (pictured). This type of terminal consists of a spring-loaded metallic pincher that opens when the lever is pressed. When the lever is released, a spring closes the terminal, which will tightly grip the conductor that has been inserted into it. This type of terminal is popular because it does not require any special connector to be applied to the end of the wire; instead, the wire is simply stripped of insulation on its end and inserted into the terminal. This terminal may be used with a variety of wire gauges as well as with either solid core or stranded wires.

DIY projects sometimes reuse speaker spring terminals for other applications, because they do not require a special connector.

== See also ==
- Banana connector
- Binding post
