= Sense line =

Sense line may refer to:

- Sense/Inhibit line, a wire in magnetic-core memory
- Remote sense connection in power supplies
- SENSE lines, connections in Intel High Definition Audio

== See also ==
- Sense lines, a term in linguistics
