= Capacitive power supply =

Type of power supply using a capacitor

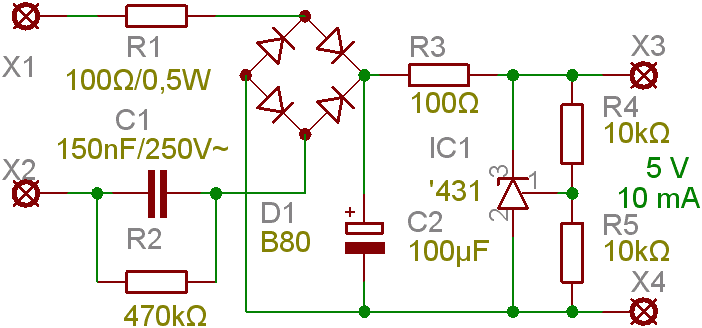
Basic diagram of a circuit for AC to DC converter. Rectifying diode bridge and 100uF C2 capacitor are visible in the center.

A capacitive power supply or capacitive dropper is a type of power supply that uses the capacitive reactance of a capacitor to reduce higher AC mains voltage to a lower DC voltage.

It is a relatively inexpensive method compared to typical solutions using a transformer, however, a relatively large mains-voltage capacitor is required and its capacitance must increase with the output current, which leads to a higher-cost and bulky capacitor. The primary downside of this type of power supply is the lack of galvanic isolation between the input and output, which means the output side is a potential shock hazard. For safety reasons, this type of power supply and every circuit connected to it must be double insulated in all places where a person could come into electrical contact with it. In addition, failure of a single component can result in unacceptably high voltages at the output. For instance, if the Zener diode in the circuit shown should fail open, there will result a gradually-rising voltage at the output, eventually reaching the input (AC) voltage.

Capacitive power supplies typically have a low power factor.

By the equation of state for capacitance, where $I_c = C \frac{\mathrm{d}V}{\mathrm{d}t}$, the current is limited to: 1 amp, per farad, per volt-rms, per radian (of phase). Or $2\pi$ amps, per farad, per volt-rms, per hertz.

== Structure ==
A capacitive power supply usually has a rectifier and filter to generate a direct current from the reduced alternating voltage.

Such a supply comprises a capacitor, C1 whose reactance limits the current flowing through the rectifier bridge D1. A resistor, R1, connected in series with it protects against voltage spikes during switching operations. An electrolytic capacitor, C2, is used to smooth the DC voltage and the peak current (in the range of amps) in switching operations. Above right a voltage regulator can be seen, formed by the current limiting resistor, R3, and the Zener shunt regulator, IC1. If the voltage stability is not too important a Zener diode can be used as a regulator; the two-terminal device would eliminate R4 and R5 used as a resistive voltage divider in the schematic above.

== Example ==
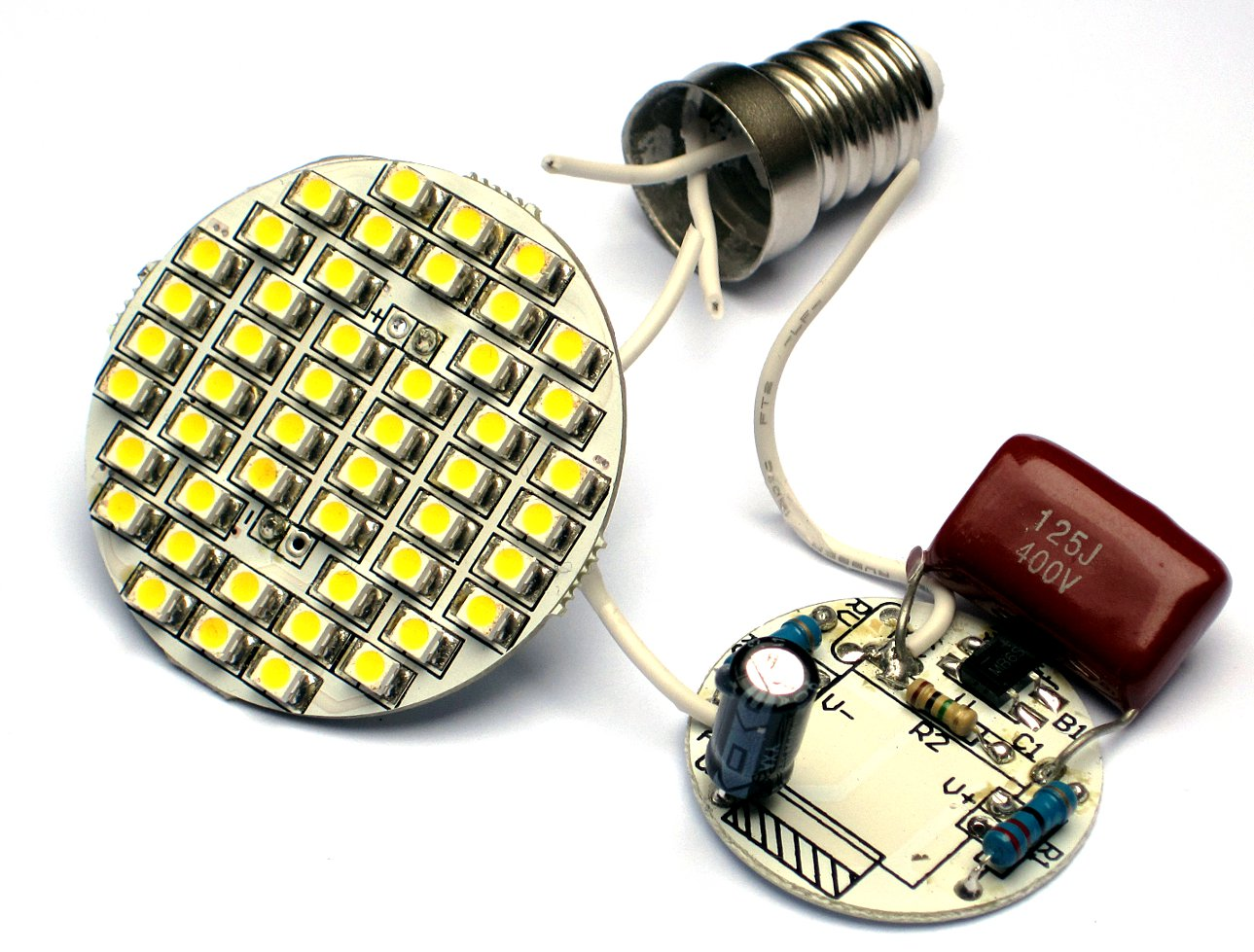
A lamp that has 48 LEDs - 3 W/230 V

By changing the value of the example in the diagram by a capacitor with a value of 330 nF, a current of approximately 20 mA can be provided, as the reactance of the 330 nF capacitor at 50 Hz calculates to $X_C = \frac{1}{2\pi\;50\,\mathrm{Hz}\;330\cdot 10^{-9}\,\mathrm{F}} \approx 9.646\,\mathrm{k\Omega}$ and applying Ohm's law, that limits the current to $I \approx \frac{230\,\mathrm{V}}{9.646\,\mathrm{k\Omega}} \approx 24\cdot10^{-3}\,\mathrm{A}$. This way up to 48 white LEDs in series can be powered (for example, 3.1 V/20 mA/20000 mcd).

Analyzing the circuit of the lamp shown in the image (on the right), at 50 Hz, the 0.125 μF capacitor has a reactance of 2.653 kΩ. By Ohm's law, the current is limited to 240 V/2653 Ω ≈ 90 mA, assuming that voltage and frequency remain constant. The LEDs are connected in parallel with the 10 μF electrolytic filter capacitor. There are four parallel branches, each having 12 LEDs in series; these branches consume about 20 mA each, or 4 x 20 = 80 mA total. The diodes limit the voltage to about 40 V per branch. Since normally the circuit is connected directly to the mains network without galvanic isolation, a residual-current circuit breaker is needed in any type of protection circuit used for this kind of LED light.

== See also ==
- Resistive dropper
- Linear regulator
- UL (safety organization)
