= Sense (electronics) =

Technique used in power supplies to produce the correct voltage for a load

In electronics, sense is a technique used in power supplies to produce the correct voltage for a load. Although simple batteries naturally maintain a steady voltage (except in cases of large internal impedance), a power supply must use a feedback system to make adjustments based on the difference between its intended output and its actual output. If this system works, the latter will be very close to the former.

Two types of sense are used, depending on where the power supply output is measured. In local sense, the supply simply measures the voltage at its output terminals, where the leads to the load connect. This method has the problem of not accounting for the voltage drop due to resistance of the leads, which is proportional to the amount of current drawn by the load. That is, the supply might be producing the correct voltage at its output terminals, but there will be a lower voltage at the input terminals of the load.

When this might cause a problem, remote sense can be used to force the power supply to counteract the voltage drop by raising the voltage at its output terminals. If successful, it will cancel the drop along the leads, yielding the correct voltage at the input terminals of the load. This is accomplished by using separate "sense leads," connected to the load's input terminals, to measure the output voltage. (Because the sensing function draws only a very small amount of current, there is practically no additional voltage drop due to the sense leads themselves.) This is the same principle behind 4-wire sensing, the generic equivalent to power supply remote sensing.

Many power supplies that are equipped with remote sense can cause catastrophic damage to the loads if they are turned on while the sense leads are unconnected. To avoid this, some supplies are equipped with auto sense, which will automatically switch between local and remote sensing depending on whether the sense leads are correctly connected.

== See also ==
- Sensor
