= Voltage droop =

Intentional loss in output voltage of a power supply as it drives a load

Voltage droop is the intentional loss in output voltage from a device as it drives a load. Adding droop in a voltage regulation circuit increases the headroom for load transients.

All electrical systems have some amount of resistance between the regulator output and the load. At high currents, even a small resistance results in substantial voltage drop between the regulator and the load. Conversely, when the output current is (near) zero, the voltage at the load is higher. This follows from Ohm's law.

Rather than increasing output voltage at high current to try to maintain the same load voltage, droop instead simply allows this drop to take place and designs around it. The behaviour of the system with and without droop is as follows:

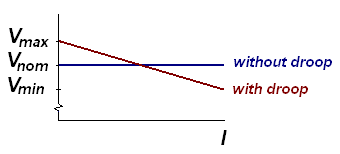

In a regulator not employing droop, when the load is suddenly increased very rapidly (i.e. a transient), the output voltage will momentarily sag. Conversely, when a heavy load is suddenly disconnected, the voltage will show a peak. The output decoupling capacitors have to "absorb" these transients before the control loop has a chance to compensate. A diagram of such transients is shown below. The maximum allowed voltage swing in such a transient is $V_{\max} - V_\text{nom}$.

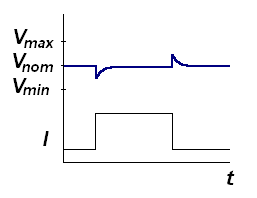

Comparing this to a regulator with droop, we find that the maximum allowed swing has doubled: it is now $V_{\max} - V_{\min}$. This increased tolerance to transients allows us to decrease the number of output capacitors, or get better regulation with the same number of capacitors.

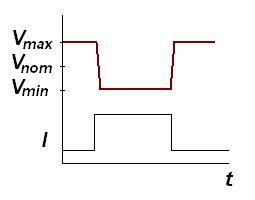
