= Speaker wire =

Electronics component

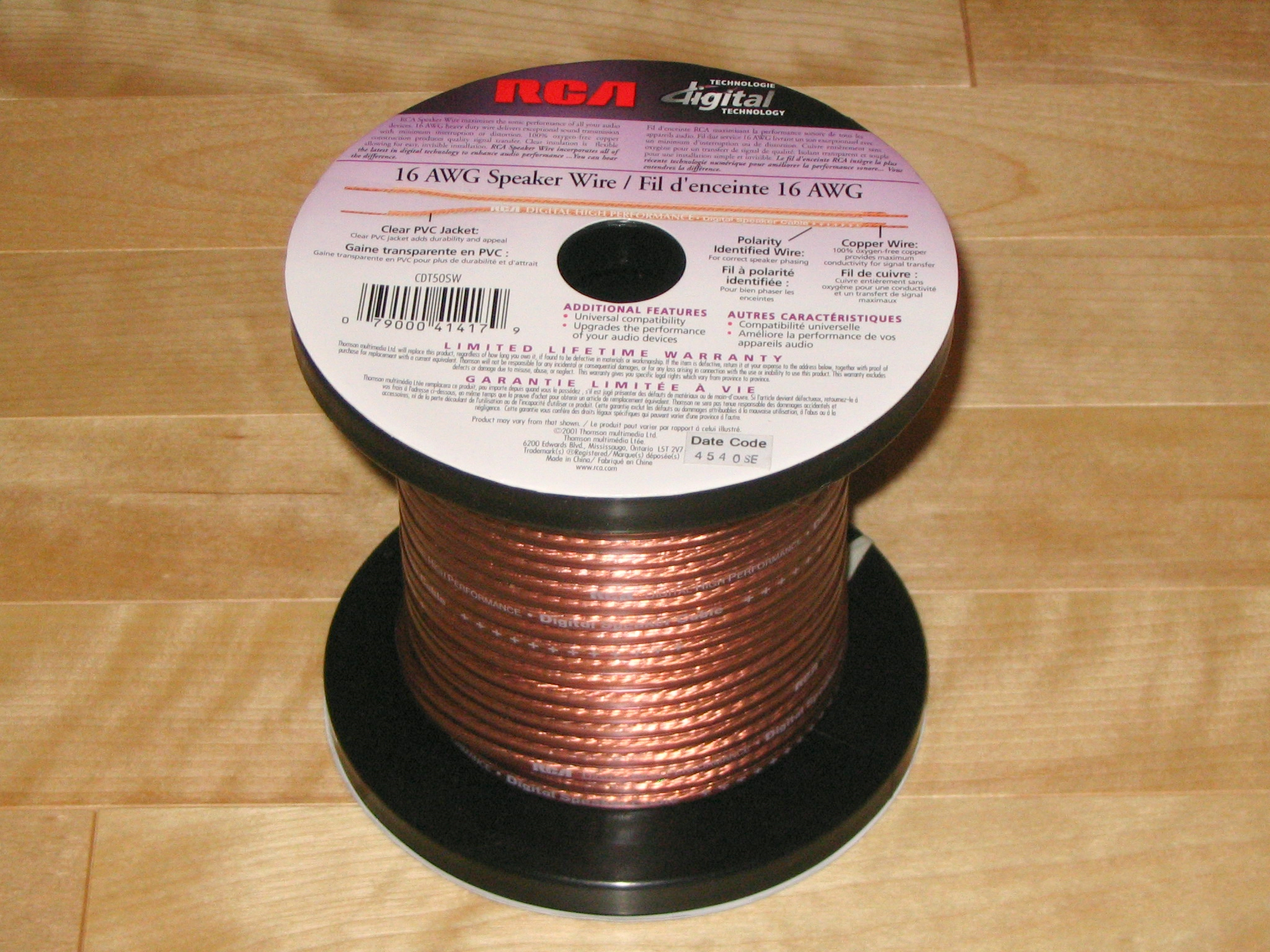
2 conductor copper speaker wire

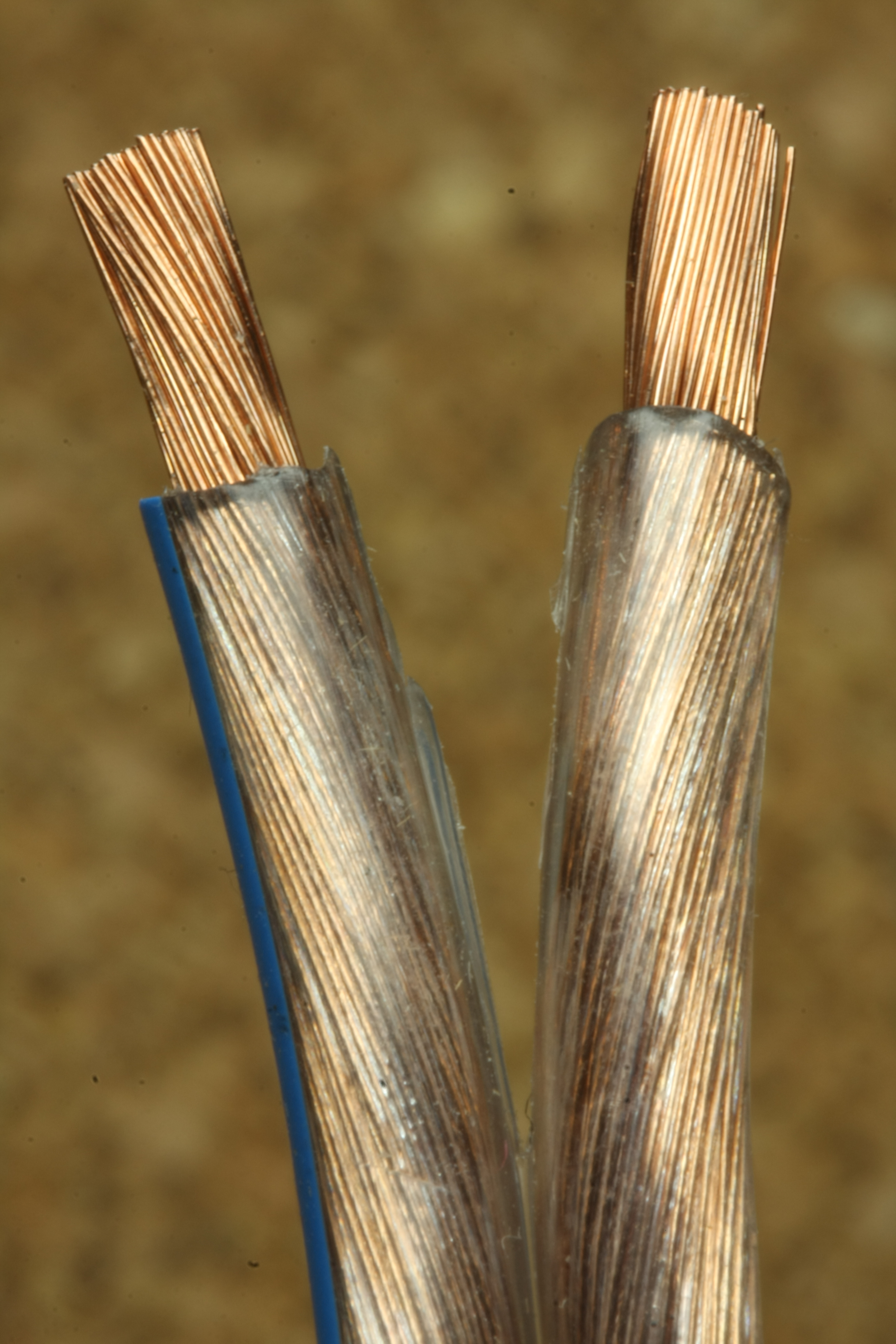
Fine-wired and therefore particularly flexible stripped speaker wires; the left wire strand is marked by a stripe

Speaker wire is used to make the electrical connection between loudspeakers and audio amplifiers. Modern speaker wire consists of two or more electrical conductors individually insulated by plastic (such as PVC, PE or Teflon) or, less commonly, rubber. The two wires are electrically identical, but are marked to identify the correct audio signal polarity. Most commonly, speaker wire comes in the form of zip cord.

The effect of speaker wire upon the signal it carries has been a much-debated topic in the audiophile and high fidelity worlds. The accuracy of many advertising claims on these points has been disputed by expert engineers who emphasize that simple electrical resistance is by far the most important characteristic of speaker wire.

== History ==
Early speaker cable was typically stranded copper wire, insulated with cloth tape, waxed paper or rubber. For portable applications, common lampcord was used, twisted in pairs for mechanical reasons. Cables were often soldered in place at one end. Other terminations were binding posts, terminal strips, and spade lugs for crimp connections. Two-conductor quarter-inch tip-sleeve phone jacks came into use in the 1920s and '30s as convenient terminations.

Some early speaker cable designs featured another pair of wires for rectified direct current to supply electrical power for an electromagnet in the loudspeaker. Essentially all speakers manufactured now use permanent magnets, a practice which displaced field electromagnet speakers in the 1940s and 1950s.

== Explanation ==
Speaker wire is a passive electrical component described by its electrical impedance, Z. The impedance can be broken up into three properties which determine its performance: the real part of the impedance, or the resistance, and the imaginary component of the impedance: capacitance or inductance. The ideal speaker wire has no resistance, capacitance, or inductance. The shorter and thicker a wire is, the lower is its resistance, as the electrical resistance of a wire is proportional to its length and inversely proportional to its cross-sectional area (except superconductors). The wire's resistance has the greatest effect on its performance. The capacitance and inductance of the wire have less effect because they are insignificant relative to the capacitance and inductance of the loudspeaker. As long as speaker wire resistance is kept to less than 5 percent of the speaker's impedance, the conductor will be adequate for home use.

Speaker wires are selected based on price, quality of construction, aesthetic purpose, and convenience. Stranded wire is more flexible than solid wire, and is suitable for movable equipment. For a wire that will be exposed rather than run within walls, under floor coverings, or behind moldings (such as in a home), appearance may be a benefit, but it is irrelevant to electrical characteristics. Better jacketing may be thicker or tougher, less chemically reactive with the conductor, less likely to tangle and easier to pull through a group of other wires, or may incorporate a number of shielding techniques for non-domestic uses.

== Resistance ==
Resistance is by far the most important specification of speaker wire. Low-resistance speaker wire allows more of the amplifier's power to energize the loudspeaker's voice coil. The performance of a conductor such as speaker wire is therefore optimised by limiting its length and maximising its cross-sectional area. Depending on the hearing ability of the listener, this resistance begins to have an audible effect when the resistance exceeds 5 percent of the speaker's impedance.

A speaker wire's impedance takes into account the wire's resistance, the wire's path, and the dielectric properties of local insulators. The latter two factors also determine the wire's frequency response. The lower the impedance of the speaker, the greater a significance the speaker wire's resistance will have.

Where large buildings have long runs of wire to interconnect speakers and amplifiers, a constant-voltage speaker system may be used to reduce losses in the wiring.

=== Wire gauge ===
Thicker wires reduce resistance. The resistance of copper 16-gauge (1.31 mm^{2}) or heavier speaker connection cable has no detectable effect in runs of 50 feet (15 meters) or less in standard domestic loudspeaker connections for a typical 8 ohm speaker. For aluminum or copper-clad aluminum wire, 14-gauge or heavier cable is needed to support this claim due to higher resistivity. As speaker impedance drops, lower gauge (heavier) wire is needed to prevent degradation to damping factor – a measure of the amplifier's control over the position of the voice coil.

Insulation thickness or type also has no audible effect as long as the insulation is of good quality and does not chemically react with the wire itself (poor-quality insulation has occasionally been found to accelerate oxidation of the copper conductor, increasing resistance over time). High-power in-car audio systems using 2-ohm speaker circuits require thicker wire than 4 to 8-ohm home audio applications.

Most consumer applications use two conductor wire. A common rule of thumb is that the resistance of the speaker wire should not exceed 5 percent of the rated impedance of the system. The table below shows recommended lengths based on this guideline:

Maximum wire lengths for two conductor copper wire
Wire size	2 Ω load	4 Ω load	6 Ω load	8 Ω load
22 AWG (0.326 mm^{2})	3 ft (0.9 m)	6 ft (1.8 m)	9 ft (2.7 m)	12 ft (3.6 m)
20 AWG (0.518 mm^{2})	5 ft (1.5 m)	10 ft (3 m)	15 ft (4.5 m)	20 ft (6 m)
18 AWG (0.823 mm^{2})	8 ft (2.4 m)	16 ft (4.9 m)	24 ft (7.3 m)	32 ft (9.7 m)
16 AWG (1.31 mm^{2})	12 ft (3.6 m)	24 ft (7.3 m)	36 ft (11 m)	48 ft (15 m)
14 AWG (2.08 mm^{2})	20 ft (6.1 m)	40 ft (12 m)	60 ft (18 m)^{*}	80 ft (24 m)^{*}
12 AWG (3.31 mm^{2})	30 ft (9.1 m)	60 ft (18 m)^{*}	90 ft (27 m)^{*}	120 ft (36 m)^{*}
10 AWG (5.26 mm^{2})	50 ft (15 m)	100 ft (30 m)^{*}	150 ft (46 m)^{*}	200 ft (61 m)^{*}

^{*} While in theory heavier wire can have longer runs, recommended household audio lengths should not exceed 50 feet (15 m).

The gauge numbers in SWG (standard wire gauge) and AWG (American wire gauge) reduce as the wire gets larger. Sizing in square millimeters is common outside of the US. Suppliers and manufacturers often specify their cable in strand count. A 189 strand count wire has a cross-sectional area of 1.5 mm^{2} which equates to 126.7 strands per mm^{2}.

=== Wire material ===
Use of copper or copper-clad aluminum (CCA) is more or less universal for speaker wire. Copper has low resistance compared to most other suitable materials. CCA is cheaper and lighter, at the expense of somewhat higher resistance (about the same as copper two AWG numbers up). Copper and aluminum both oxidize, but oxides of copper are conductive, while those of aluminum are insulating. Also offered is Oxygen-free Copper (OFC), sold in several grades. The various grades are marketed as having better conductivity and durability, but they have no significant benefit in audio applications. Commonly available C11000 Electrolytic-Tough-Pitch (ETP) copper wire is identical to higher-cost C10200 Oxygen-Free (OF) copper wire in speaker cable applications. Much more expensive C10100, a highly refined copper with silver impurities removed and oxygen reduced to 0.0005 percent, has only a one percent increase in conductivity rating, insignificant in audio applications.

Silver has a slightly lower resistivity than copper, which allows a thinner wire to have the same resistance. Silver is expensive, so a copper wire with the same resistance costs considerably less. Silver tarnishes to form a thin surface layer of silver sulfide.

Gold has a higher resistivity than either copper or silver, but pure gold does not oxidize, so it can be used for plating wire-end terminations.

== Capacitance and inductance ==
=== Capacitance ===
Capacitance occurs between any two conductors separated by an insulator. In an audio cable, capacitance occurs between the cable's two conductors; the resulting losses are called "dielectric losses" or "dielectric absorption". Capacitance also occurs between the cable's conductors and any nearby conductive objects, including house wiring and damp foundation concrete; this is called "stray capacitance".

Parallel capacitances add together, and so both the dielectric loss and the stray capacitance loss add up to a net capacitance.

Audio signals are alternating current and so are attenuated by such capacitances. Attenuation occurs inversely to frequency: a higher frequency faces less resistance and can more easily leak through a given capacitance. The amount of attenuation can be calculated for any given frequency; the result is called the capacitive reactance, which is an effective resistance measured in ohms:

$$X_c = \frac{1}{2 \pi f C}$$

where:

- $f$ is the frequency in hertz; and
- $C$ is the capacitance in farads.

This table shows the capacitive reactance in ohms (higher means lower loss) for various frequencies and capacitances; highlighted rows represent loss greater than 1% at 30 volts RMS:

Capacitance	100 Hz	200 Hz	500 Hz	1,000 Hz	2,000 Hz	5,000 Hz	10,000 Hz	20,000 Hz	50,000 Hz
100 pF (0.1 nF)	15,915,508	7,957,754	3,183,102	1,591,551	795,775	318,310	159,155	79,578	31,831
200 pF (0.2 nF)	7,957,754	3,978,877	1,591,551	795,775	397,888	159,155	79,578	39,789	15,916
500 pF (0.5 nF)	3,183,102	1,591,551	636,620	318,310	159,155	63,662	31,831	15,916	6,366
1,000 pF (1 nF)	1,591,551	795,775	318,310	159,155	79,578	31,831	15,916	7,958	3,183
2,000 pF (2 nF)	795,775	397,888	159,155	79,578	39,789	15,916	7,958	3,979	1,592
5,000 pF (5 nF)	318,310	159,155	63,662	31,831	15,916	6,366	3,183	1,592	637
10,000 pF (10 nF)	159,155	79,578	31,831	15,916	7,958	3,183	1,592	796	318
20,000 pF (20 nF)	79,578	39,789	15,916	7,958	3,979	1,592	796	398	159
50,000 pF (50 nF)	31,831	15,916	6,366	3,183	1,592	637	318	159	64
100,000 pF (100 nF)	15,916	7,958	3,183	1,592	796	318	159	80	32
200,000 pF (200 nF)	7,958	3,979	1,592	796	398	159	80	40	16
500,000 pF (500 nF)	3,183	1,592	637	318	159	64	32	16	6

The voltage on a speaker wire depends on amplifier power; for a 100-watt-per-channel amplifier, the voltage will be about 30 volts RMS. At such voltage, a 1 percent loss will occur at 3,000 ohms or less of capacitive reactance. Therefore, to keep audible (up to 20,000 Hz) losses below 1 percent, the total capacitance in the cabling must be kept below about 2,700 pF.

Ordinary lamp cord has a capacitance of 10–20 pF/ft, plus a few picofarads of stray capacitance, so a 100-foot run (200 total feet of conductor) will have less than 1 percent capacitive loss in the audible range (100 ft * 20 pF/ft = 2000 pF, and 2000 pF < 2700 pF). Some premium speaker cables have higher capacitance in order to have lower inductance; 100–300 pF is typical, in which case the capacitive loss will exceed 1 percent for runs longer than as little as 10 feet (10 ft * 300 pF/ft = 3000 pF, and 3000 pF > 2700 pF).

=== Inductance ===
All conductors have inductance, which results in an inherent resistance to changes in a current. That resistance is called inductive reactance, measured in ohms. Inductive reactance depends on how quickly the current is changing: quick changes in current (i.e., high frequencies) encounter a higher inductive reactance than do slow changes (low frequencies). Inductive reactance is calculated using this formula:

$$X_i = 2 \pi f L$$

where:

- $f$ is the frequency in hertz; and
- $L$ is the inductance in henries.

Audio signals are alternating current and so are attenuated by inductance. The following table shows the inductive reactance in ohms (lower means lower loss) for typical cable inductances at various audio frequencies; highlighted rows represent loss greater than 1% at 30 volts RMS:

Inductance (μH)	100 Hz	200 Hz	500 Hz	1,000 Hz	2,000 Hz	5,000 Hz	10,000 Hz	20,000 Hz	50,000 Hz
0.1	0.0	0.0	0.0	0.0	0.0	0.0	0.0	0.0	0.0
0.2	0.0	0.0	0.0	0.0	0.0	0.0	0.0	0.0	0.1
0.5	0.0	0.0	0.0	0.0	0.0	0.0	0.0	0.1	0.2
1	0.0	0.0	0.0	0.0	0.0	0.0	0.1	0.1	0.3
2	0.0	0.0	0.0	0.0	0.0	0.1	0.1	0.3	0.6
5	0.0	0.0	0.0	0.0	0.1	0.2	0.3	0.6	1.6
10	0.0	0.0	0.0	0.1	0.1	0.3	0.6	1.3	3.1
20	0.0	0.0	0.1	0.1	0.3	0.6	1.3	2.5	6.3
50	0.0	0.1	0.2	0.3	0.6	1.6	3.1	6.3	15.7
100	0.1	0.1	0.3	0.6	1.3	3.1	6.3	12.6	31.4
200	0.1	0.3	0.6	1.3	2.5	6.3	12.6	25.1	62.8
500	0.3	0.6	1.6	3.1	6.3	15.7	31.4	62.8	157.1

The voltage on a speaker wire depends on amplifier power; for a 100-watt-per-channel amplifier, the voltage will be about 30 volts RMS. At such voltage, a 1% loss will occur at 0.3 ohms or more of inductive reactance. Therefore, to keep audible (up to 20,000 Hz) losses below 1%, the total inductance in the cabling must be kept below about 2 μH.

Ordinary lamp cord has an inductance of 0.1–0.2 μH/ft, likewise for shielded cord, so a run of up to about 10 feet (20 total feet of conductor) will have less than 1% inductive loss in the audible range (10 ft * 0.2 μH/ft = 2.0 μH, which is at or below the proximate threshold of 2 μH given above). Some premium speaker cables have lower inductance at the cost of higher capacitance; 0.02-0.05μH/ft is typical, which at the worst end means that a run of up to about 40 feet will have less than 1% inductive loss (40 ft * 0.05 μH/ft = 2.0& μH).

=== Skin effect ===
Skin effect in audio cables is the tendency for high frequency signals to travel more on the surface than in the center of the conductor, as if the conductor were a hollow metal pipe. This tendency, caused by self-inductance, makes the cable more resistant at higher frequencies, diminishing its ability to transmit high frequencies with as much power as low frequencies. As cable conductors increase in diameter they have less overall resistance but increased skin effect. The choice of metals in the conductor makes a difference, too: silver has a greater skin effect than copper; aluminum has less effect. Skin effect is a significant problem at radio frequencies or over long distances such as miles and kilometers worth of high-tension electrical transmission lines, but not at audio frequencies carried over short distances measured in feet and meters. Speaker cables are normally made with stranded conductors but bare metal strands in contact with each other do not mitigate skin effect; the bundle of strands acts as one conductor at audio frequencies. Litz wire – individually insulated strands held in a particular pattern – is a type of high-end speaker wire intended to reduce skin effect. Another solution that has been tried is to plate the copper strands with silver which has less resistance.

Regardless of marketing claims, skin effect has an inaudible and therefore negligible effect in typical inexpensive cables for loudspeaker or other audio signals. The increase in resistance for signals at 20,000 Hz is under 3%, in the range of a few milliohms for the common home stereo system; an insignificant and inaudible degree of attenuation.

== Terminations ==
Speaker wire terminations facilitate the connection of speaker wire to both amplifiers and loudspeakers. Examples of termination include soldered or crimped pin or spade lugs, banana plugs, and 2-pin DIN connectors. The Speakon connector, a commercial speaker wire connector from Neutrik, has some advantages: it does not easily pull free, does not make partial contact when making or breaking (1/4 plugs and sockets inherently do so) and offers multi circuits in some versions. The type of actual electrical contact (ie, termination) is determined by the connectors on the equipment at each end of the wire. Some terminations are gold plated.

Many speakers and electronics have flexible five-way binding posts that can be screwed down or held down by a spring to accept bare or soldered wire and pins or springy banana plugs (through a hole in the outward-facing side of the post).

== Quality debate ==
There is debate among audiophiles surrounding the impact that high-end cables have on audio systems with audibility of the changes central to the discussion. While some speaker wire marketers claim audible improvement with design or exotic materials, skeptics say that a few meters of speaker wire from the power amplifier to the binding posts of the loudspeakers cannot possibly have much influence because of the greater influence from complex crossover circuits found in most speakers and particularly from the speaker driver voice coils that have several meters of very thin wire. To justify claims of enhanced audio quality, many marketers of high-end speaker cables cite electrical properties such as skin effect, characteristic impedance or resonance; properties which are generally little understood by consumers. None of these have any measurable effect at audio frequencies, though each matters at radio frequencies. Industry experts have disproven the higher quality claims through measurement of the sound systems and through double-blind ABX tests of listeners. There is however agreement that the overall resistance of the speaker wire should not be too high. As well, the observed problems with speaker cable quality are largest for loudspeakers with passive cross-overs such as those typical of home stereos.

An accepted guideline is that the wire resistance should not exceed 5% of the entire circuit. For a given material, resistance is a function of length and thickness (specifically of the ratio of length to cross-sectional area). For this reason, lower impedance speakers require lower resistance speaker wire. Longer cable runs need to be even thicker. Once the 5% guideline is met, thicker wire will not provide any improvement.

Roger Russell – a former engineer and speaker designer for McIntosh Labs – details how expensive speaker wire brand marketing misinforms consumers in his online essay called Speaker Wire – A History. He writes, "The industry has now reached the point where [wire] resistance and listening quality are not the issues any more, although listening claims may still be made...The strategy in selling these products is, in part, to appeal to those who are looking to impress others with something unique and expensive."

== See also ==
- Copper conductor
- Electrical impedance
- Loudspeaker enclosure
- Psychoacoustics
