= Binding post =

Electrical connector

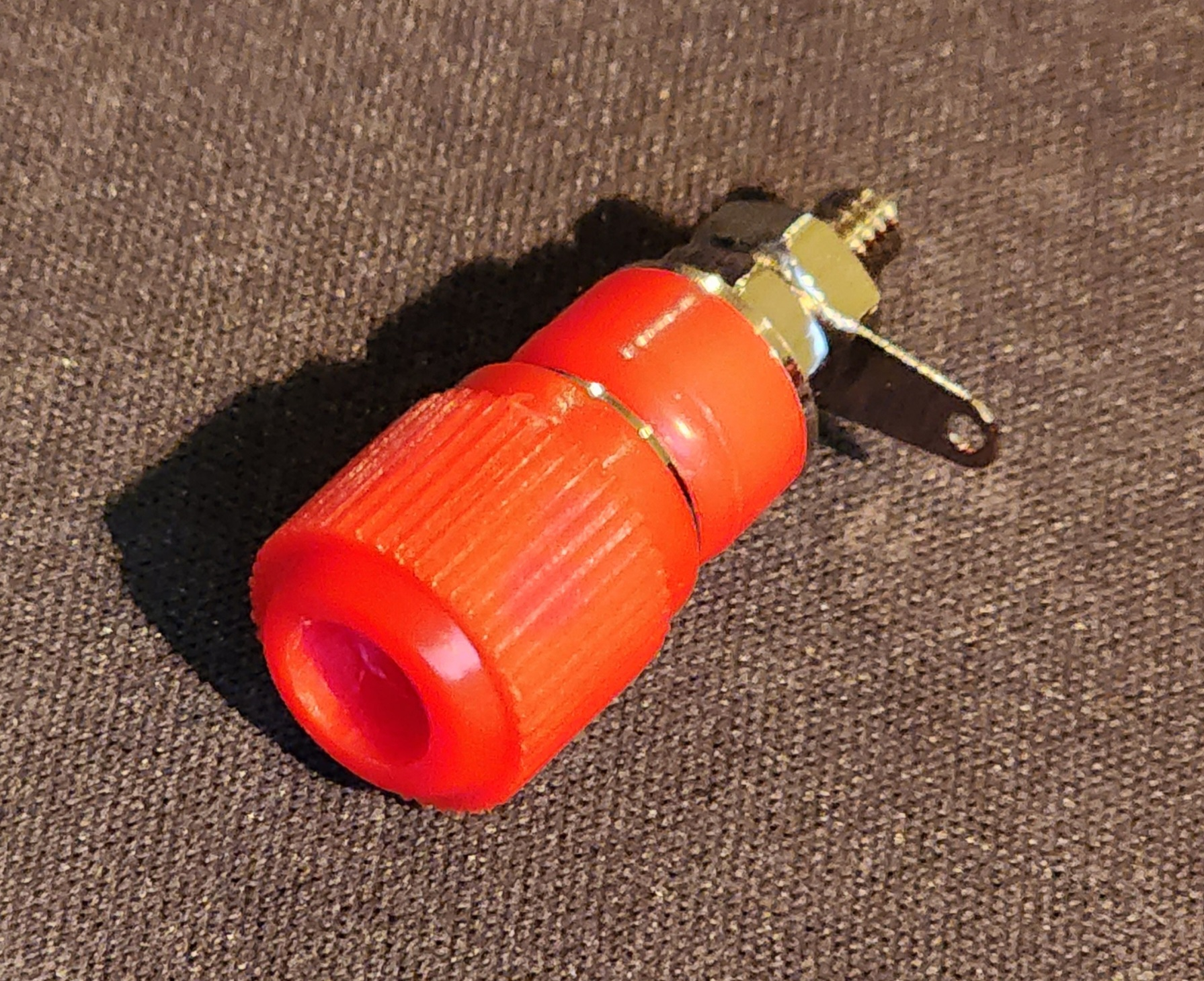
A binding post, colored red, which usually indicates a positive terminal.

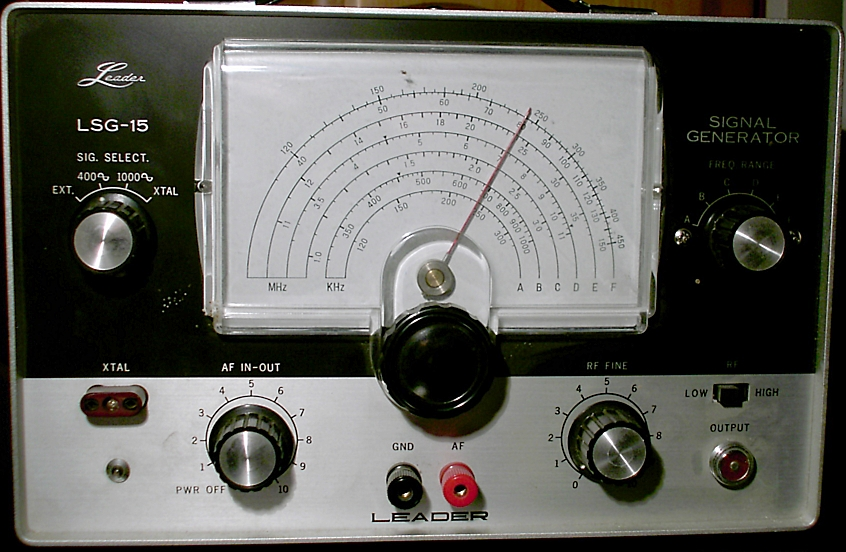
Two insulated, color-coded binding posts at the bottom center of a historical signal generator; modern devices often have bandwidths exceeding the utility of such connectors

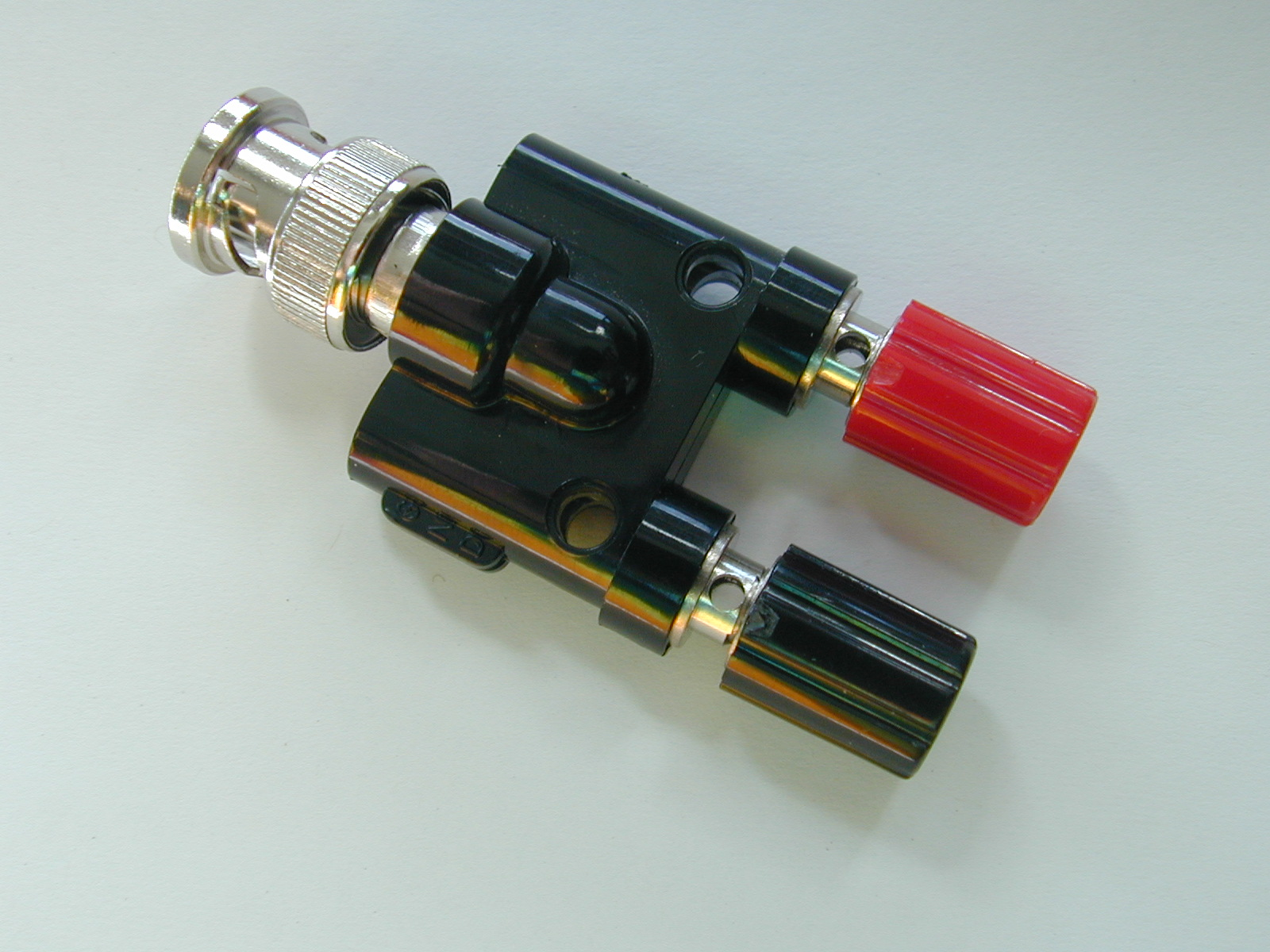
Adapter between five-way binding posts and a male BNC connector

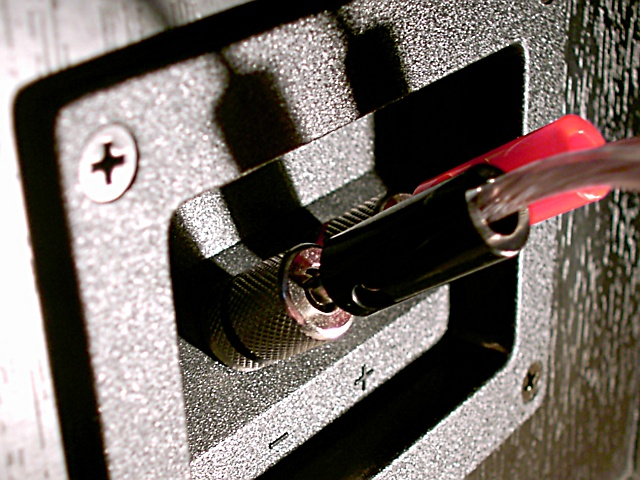
Uninsulated binding posts on a loudspeaker connected to banana plugs

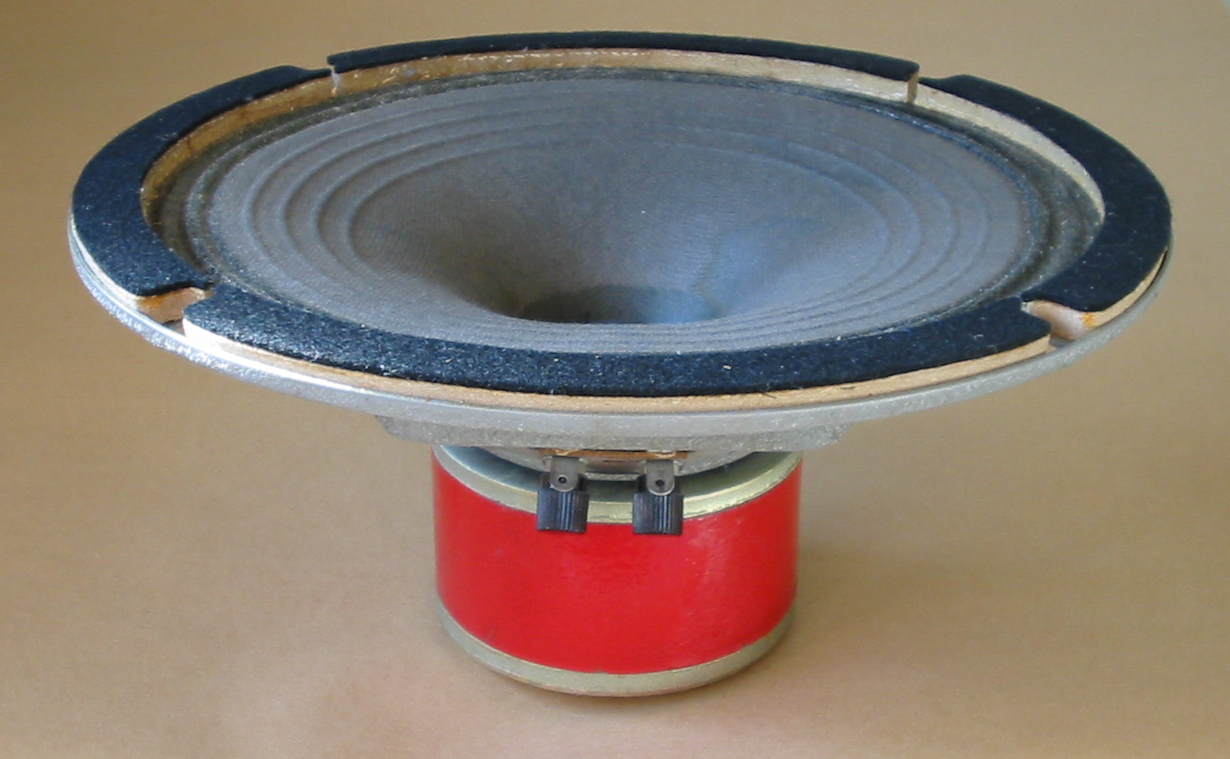
Small black binding posts of an old loudspeaker driver are visible. These binding posts are not compatible with banana plugs of any size. Instead they were endowed with small solder contacts.

A binding post is a connector commonly used on electronic test equipment to terminate (attach) a single wire or test lead. They are also found on loudspeakers and audio amplifiers as well as other electrical equipment. A binding post contains a central threaded metal rod and a cap that screws down on that rod.

== History ==
A binding post contains a central threaded metal rod and a cap that screws down on that rod. Binding posts slowly evolved from 19th century general purpose fasteners into 20th century electrical binding posts. Examples of binding posts used during the 19th century are telegraph key and blasting machine devices.

Caps are commonly insulated with plastic and color-coded: red commonly means an active or positive terminal; black indicates an inactive (reference or return) or negative terminal; and green indicates an earth (ground) terminal. Caps during the 19th century were typically bare metal until synthetic plastic, such as Bakelite, became available in the early 20th century.

During the late 1940s, General Radio created a new binding post that had a jack in a cap.

Today it is commonly known as a five-way or universal binding post, which allows many types of connection methods:

- Banana plugs - a banana plug is inserted into the top open end of the binding post.
- Alligator clip - a slender alligator clip is clipped onto the top open end of the binding post.
- Bare wire - wire is wrapped around the metal post, then top cap is screwed down on it.
- Spade connector - wire is inserted into spade connector (1/4" throat) then crimped to secure the wire, then spade inserted around the metal post, then top cap is screwed down on it.
- Bare wire - wire (up to 10 AWG) is inserted into hole in metal post, then top cap is screwed down on it.
- Pin connector (telephone tip) - wire is inserted into pin connector then crimped to secure the wire, then inserted into metal post, then top cap is screwed down on it.

== Safety ==
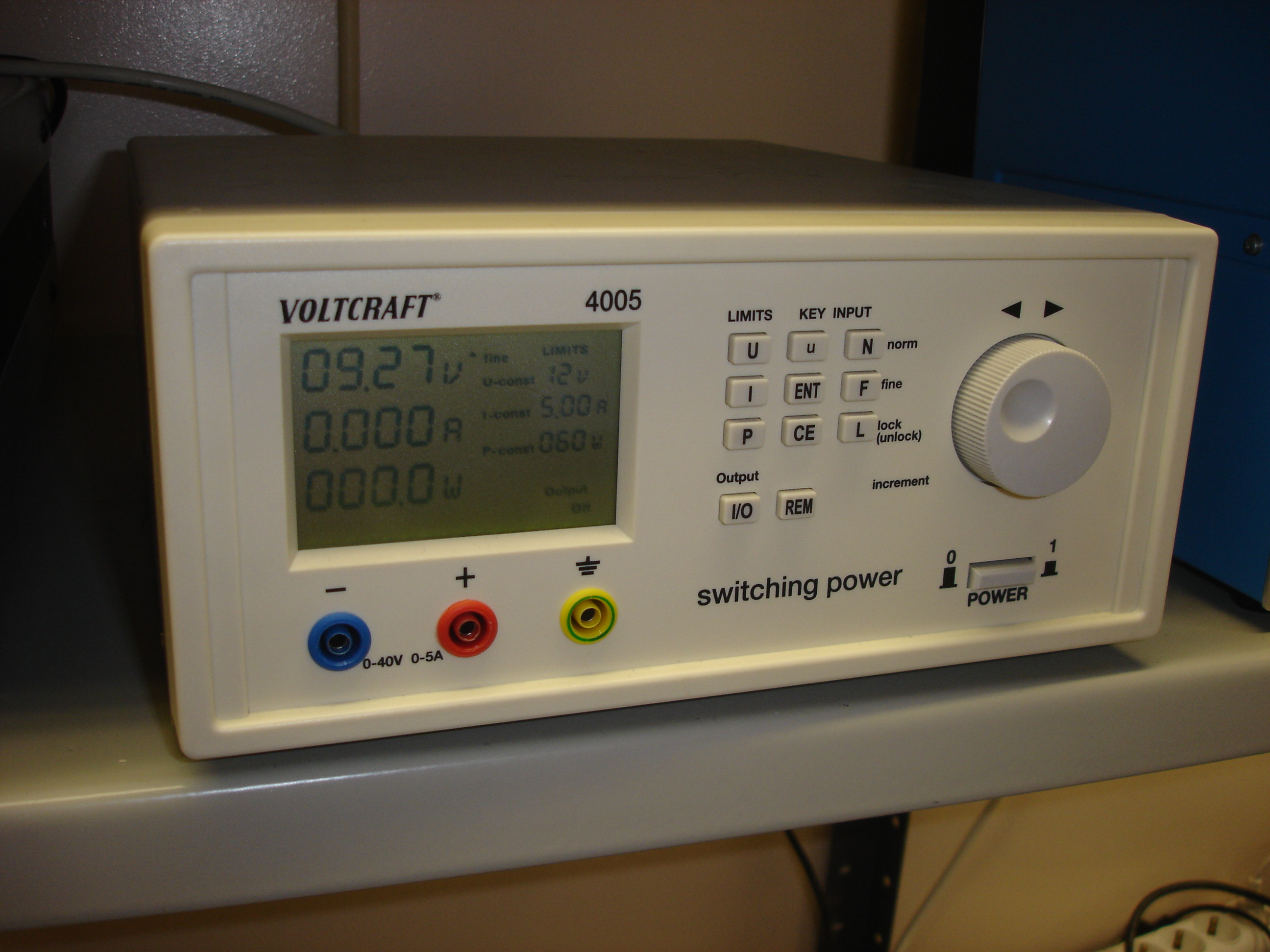
An adjustable switched-mode power supply for laboratory use with three safety banana jacks instead of binding posts

Even so-called isolated binding posts are typically not sufficiently isolated to protect users from coming into contact with their metal parts carrying voltage. As such they are not suitable to be used for carrying dangerous voltages (cf. extra-low voltage). On several types of equipment it has been becoming common to no longer use the traditional binding posts, but safety banana jacks. The universal property of binding posts is lost here, since safety banana jacks can only be used with traditional and safety banana plugs.

In the past, it was common for multiple five-way binding posts to have their drilled holes lined up; this provided convenience in some applications as a bare wire could be strung from post to post to post. But this also impaired safety as two wires or pin connectors could be inserted from opposite sides of two binding posts and the tips of the wires or probes might inadvertently short together. Holes are now normally aligned in such a fashion that such shorts cannot occur.

== Standard spacing ==
In order to permit the use of double banana plugs, the most common distance between the centers of the plugs should be 3/4 inch (19.05 mm), which originated on General Radio test equipment during the 1920s, however 3/4 inch is not the only spacing.

== See also ==
- Banana connector
- Fahnestock clip — an earlier device, now largely supplanted by binding posts
