= Banana connector =

Single-wire electrical connector used for joining wires to equipment

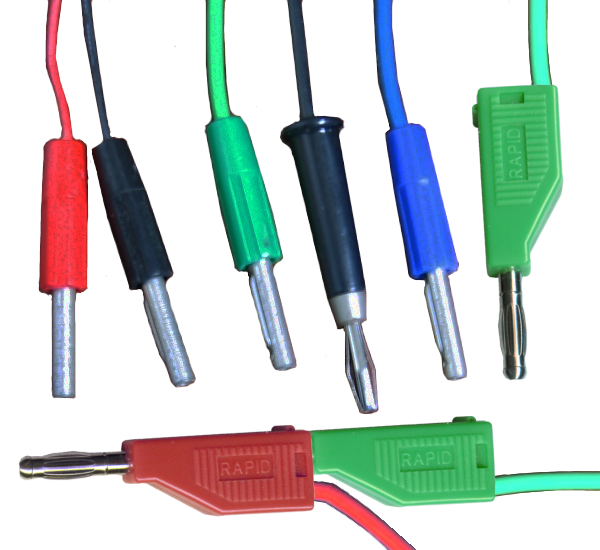
Various laboratory-style 4 mm banana plugs

Loudspeaker-style banana plugs (with speaker wires) connected to a loudspeaker

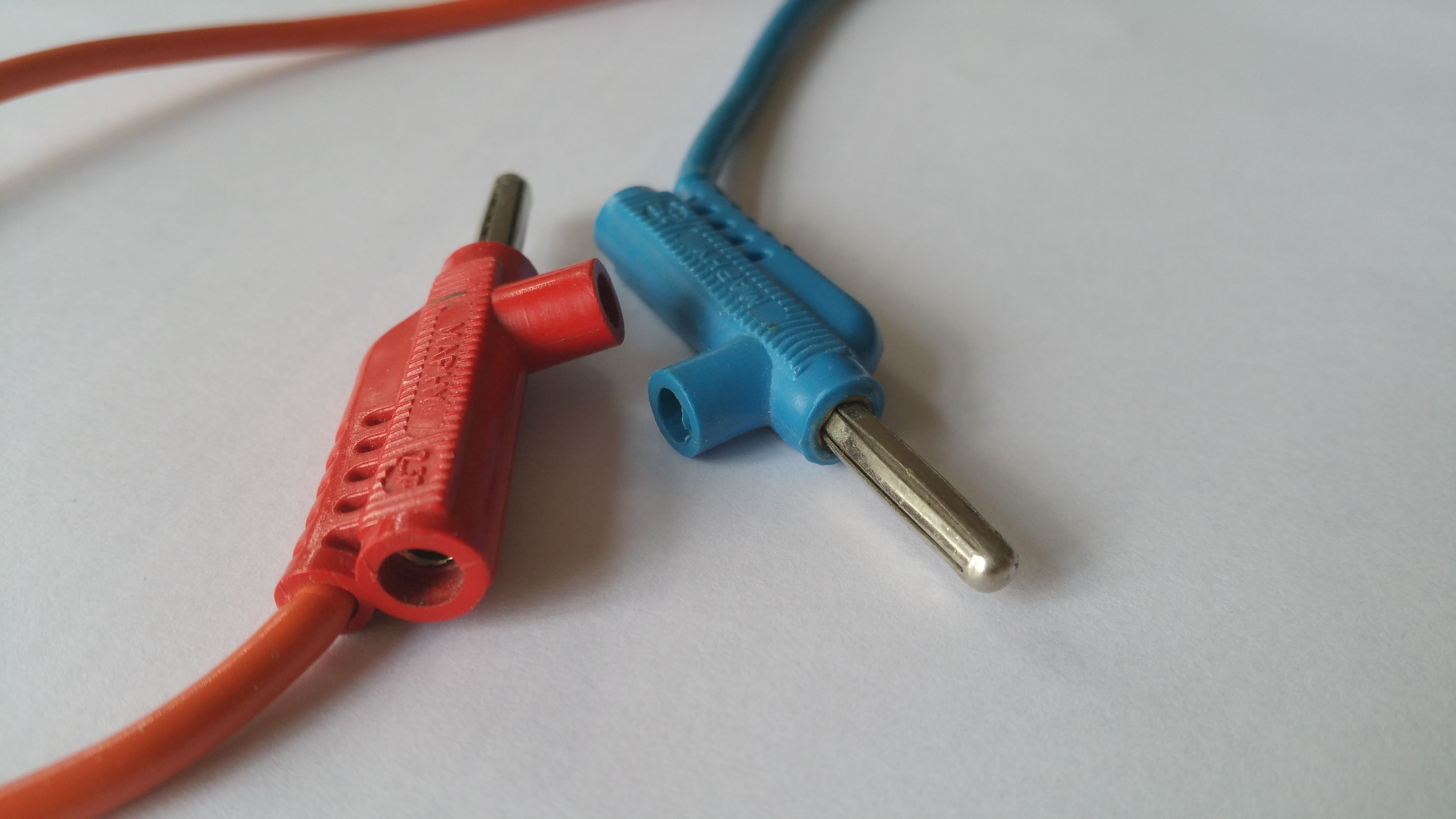
Double-stackable banana plugs for junction into two additional parallel circuits.

A banana connector (commonly banana plug for the male, banana jack (or socket) for the female) is a single-wire (one conductor) electrical connector used for joining wires to equipment. The term 4 mm connector is also used, especially in Europe, although not all banana connectors will mate with 4 mm parts, and 2 mm banana connectors exist. Various styles of banana plug contacts exist, all based on the concept of spring metal applying outward force into the unsprung cylindrical jack to produce a snug fit with good electrical conductivity. Common types include: a solid pin split lengthwise and splayed slightly, a tip of four leaf springs, a cylinder with a single leaf spring on one side, a bundle of stiff wire, a central pin surrounded by a multiple-slit cylinder with a central bulge, or simple sheet spring metal rolled into a nearly complete cylinder. The plugs are frequently used to terminate patch cords for electronic test equipment such as laboratory power supplies, while sheathed banana plugs are common on multimeter probe leads.

== History ==
Invention of the plug is claimed by two entities:

1. The Hirschmann company claims it was invented by Richard Hirschmann in 1924. In 1929 Richard Hirschmann was granted a patent in Germany for an improved banana plug. The patent describes a banana plug that consists of two parts only. Not needing a small screw to hold the wire in place, like in conventional Bananensteckern (banana plugs), is presented as an advantage of the invention.
2. The General Radio Company claims it introduced the banana plug in the United States in 1924. Various banana plug (type 274) products are shown in a September 1928 catalog and prices were listed in a July 1928 newsletter.

== Design ==
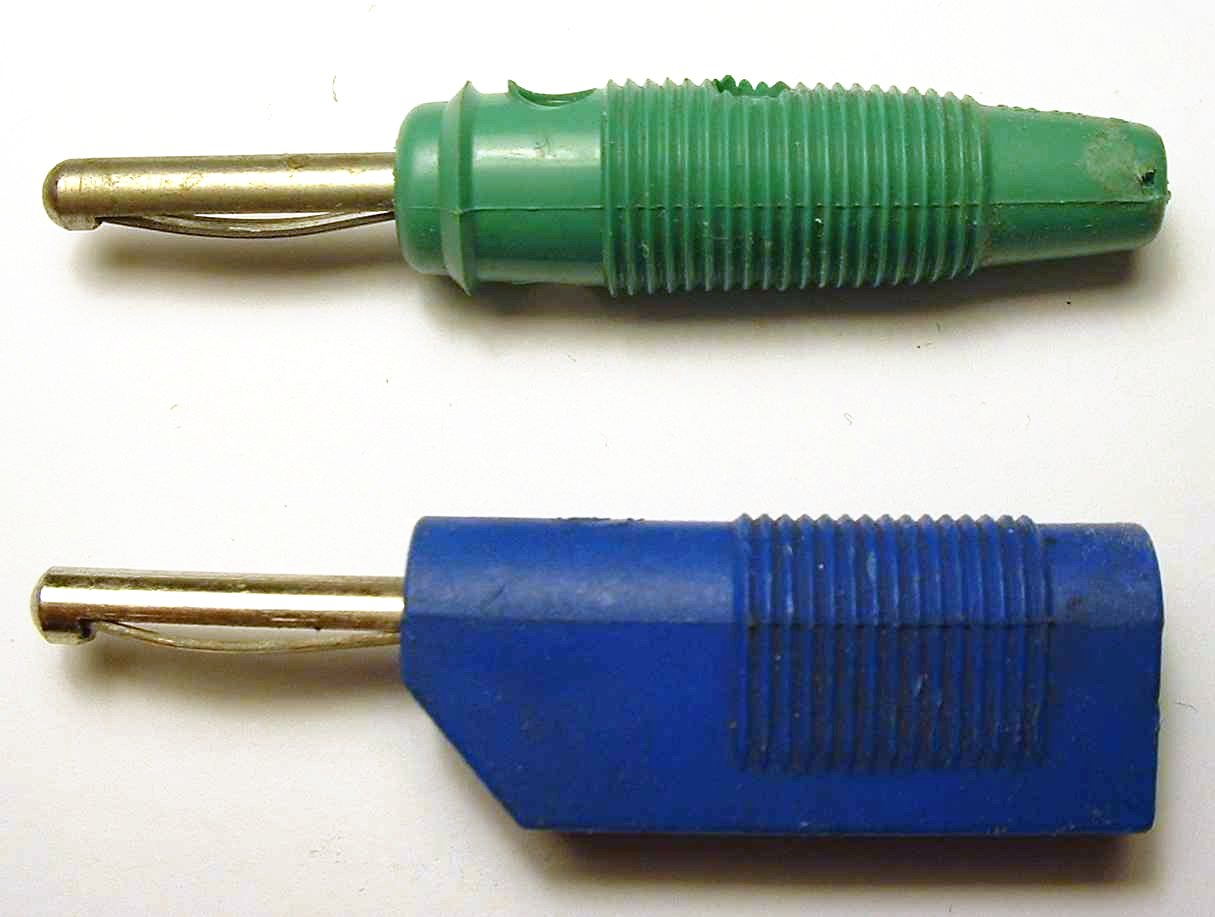
Banana plugs with the curved spring visible

The original plug consists of a cylindrical metal pin about 20 millimetres (3/4 in) long. This pin length is still common in Europe and other parts of the world. However, other sizes have emerged, such as 15 millimetres (5/8 in) pins, which can commonly be found in the US. Other lengths between 11 millimetres (3/8 in) and 25 millimetres (1 in) are less common.

The pin's diameter is nominally 4 millimetres (5/32 in). The pin has one or more lengthwise springs that bulge outwards slightly, giving the appearance of a banana. Taking the springs into account, the actual diameter of a banana plug is typically a bit larger than 4 mm when not plugged in. When inserted into a matching 4 mm socket, the springs press against the sides of the socket, improving the electrical contact and preventing the pin from falling out. The other end of the plug has a lug connector to which a length of flexible insulated equipment wire can be attached, which is either screwed, soldered, or crimped into place. On banana plugs for laboratory use, an insulating plastic cover is usually fitted over this rear end of the connector, while banana plugs for speaker connections often use uninsulated metal bodies.

The rear end of a 4 mm plug often has a 4 mm hole drilled in it, either transversely or axially, or both, to accept the pin of another 4 mm plug. This type is called a stackable or stacking plug.

For high voltage use, sheathed versions of the banana plug and socket are used. These add an insulating sheath around both the male and female connectors to avoid accidental contact. The sheathed male plug will not work with an unsheathed female socket, but an unsheathed male plug will fit a sheathed female socket.

Individual banana plugs and jacks are commonly color-coded red and black, but are available in a wide variety of colors. Dual banana plugs are often black with some physical feature such as a molded ridge or thick tab, marked "Gnd" to indicate the relative polarity of the two plugs.

Besides plugging into specific banana jacks, banana plugs may plug into "five-way" or "universal" binding posts.

== Standard spacing ==
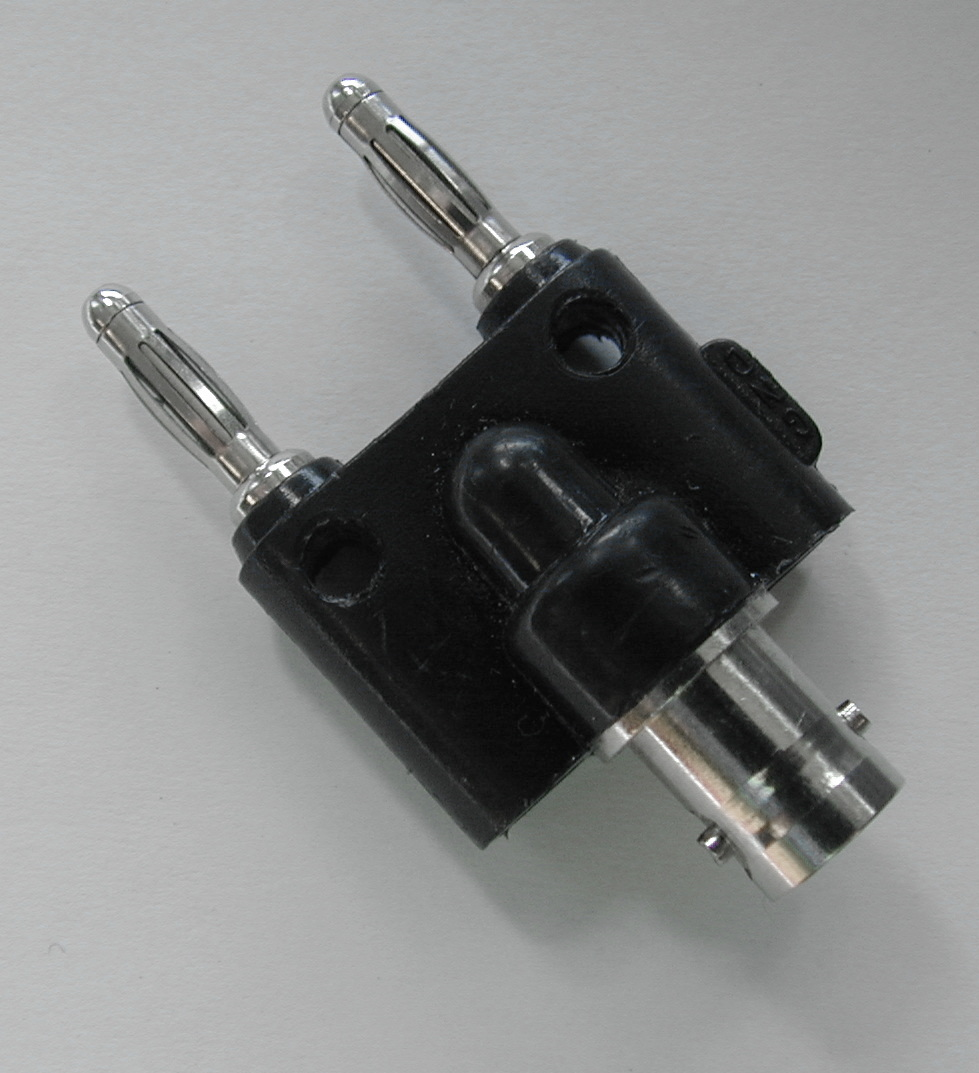
Adapter between a female BNC connector and double banana plugs

A number of widely used plugs are based on combining two or more banana plugs in a common plastic housing and other features for ease of use and to prevent accidental insertion in other such plugs. Many of these plugs are derived from the "double banana" plug, which consists simply of two banana plugs spaced 3/4 inch (19.05 mm) apart (measured from center to center of each individual plug). The 3/4 inch spacing originated on General Radio test equipment in the 1920s, and their type 274-M dual-plug is a notable example from that period.

The housing may allow the connection of individual wires, a permanently attached coaxial cable providing both signal and ground, or a coaxial connector such as the BNC connector shown in the photo. Conventionally the tab located on one side of the dual banana plug denotes the ground, shell, or negative (reference) side of the connector.

== Miniature banana connectors ==
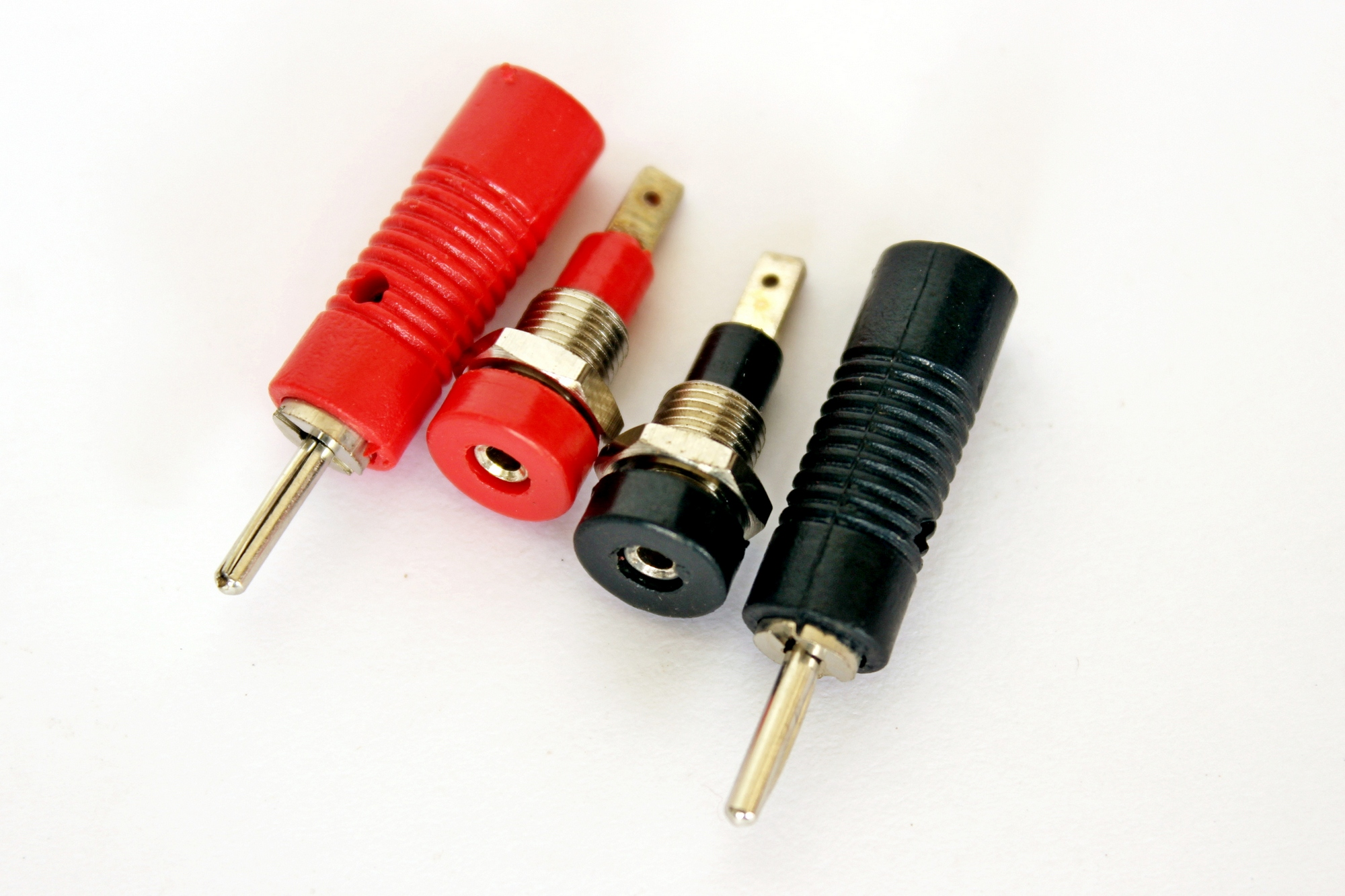
Banana jack connector: male–female pair 2 mm

Various miniature versions of the banana connector have been introduced. One type is 2.6 mm in diameter and about one third the length of the standard connector, and is commonly used in model railway applications. These are substantially more fragile than the larger connectors. Multiple miniature banana connectors are usually spaced on 1/2 inch centers. Another miniature type is the 2 mm banana connector, which is otherwise identical to the 4 mm version, including the various plug contact styles and availability of encased versions for high voltage applications.

== Pin tip jacks ==
A closely related but different design is the so-called "pin tip plug" and matching "pin tip jack". Its plug design resembles the banana plug but without the spring on the male pin; instead, it relies on spring action in the female jack, or tightly machined tolerances, to ensure good contact. The diameter of the male pin is 2 mm. The pin tip plug design was used where maximum density of connectors was desired (such as in pin plugboards), or where a very compact connector was needed.

== Wander plug ==
These superficially similar plugs were widely used in the UK and elsewhere until the 1960s. A significant use was for connecting the separate HT (High Tension, usually 90 volts) and grid bias batteries in early battery powered valve (tube) radios and for the antenna and earth (ground) connections and external loudspeaker in both mains and battery powered valve radios. The battery terminals were short (approximately 6 mm to 10 mm) bell-mouthed brass tubes of 1/8 inch (3.175 mm) nominal internal diameter. The wander plug's name may have derived from its need to "wander about" when setting the correct grid bias voltage(s) for the most economical operation of the radio.

The wander plug was always used in a rigid socket and therefore the pin end was split to allow some elasticity and provide a secure fit in the socket. It often featured a machined brass component which formed the pin contact (which was split) and the means of connecting the external wire, clamped by means of a screw-on coloured hard plastic cap. Another design used an actual split pin of plated steel, the parallel ends of which formed the plug tip. It featured a machined brass component with an internal bore of just over 1/8 inch, a transverse slot to accommodate the eye end of the split pin, and an external screw thread to engage the coloured hard plastic cap, tightening of which trapped the stripped end of the wire in the eye of the split pin to establish a secure connection.

The wander plug may have pre-dated the banana plug, but was virtually obsolete by the 1970s, by which time most of the equipment requiring them was long obsolete.

Wander plugs generally would not inter-mate successfully with banana sockets, and attempts to do so by spreading the brass tip often ended with its fracture. The tip of some banana plugs could be forced into some sockets intended for wander plugs, but would invariably be insecure.

== Electrical safety ==
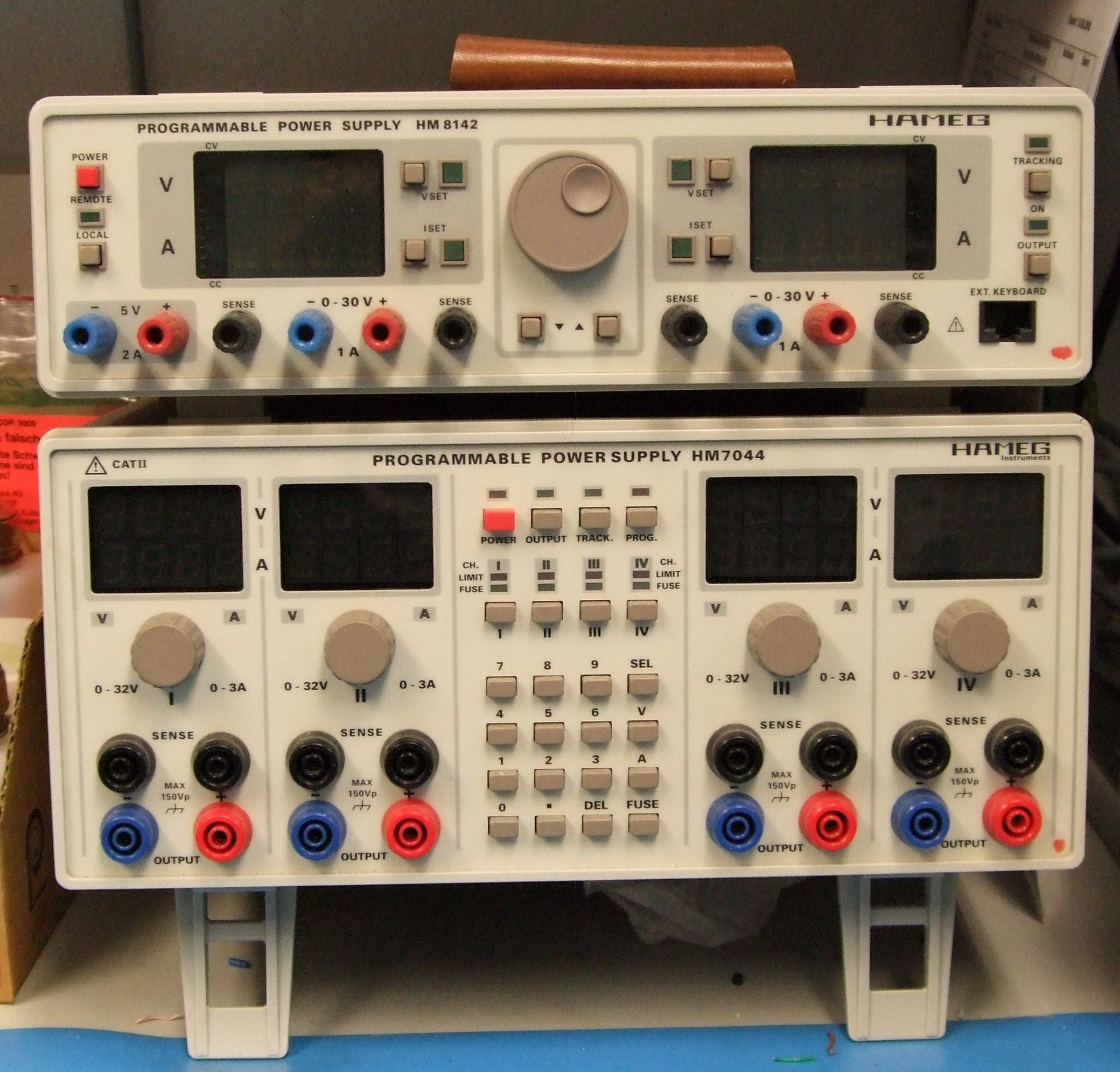
Two Hameg programmable power supplies: the top supply has screw-type banana jacks, while the bottom supply has safety-type banana jacks

Quality banana plugs and cables are typically rated for 30 V at 15 A. Cheaper cables may have one or more downsides: lower quality plugs, smaller diameter wire, lower strand count wire, thinner insulation, or lower quality insulation. Unsheathed banana connectors are not usually rated for mains voltage.

One reason why banana connectors are not rated for mains usage is that an exposed banana plug or socket can present a shock hazard if connected to an energized source. A plug that is only partially inserted into a jack can also present a risk of accidental contact, because the conductive surface of the plug will not be completely covered. This can especially happen if a 20 mm long plug is inserted into a socket that is only intended for 15 mm long plugs. Some banana plugs have exposed set screws that are electrically connected to the wire. When stacking plugs using transverse holes in a plug, large parts of the pin of the second plug are exposed. Another reason why banana connectors are not rated for mains usage is the lack of double insulation of wires and connectors. The hazards include electric shock, electrocution, burns from accidental short circuits, and damage to the attached equipment.

Where electrical safety is an issue, sheathed plugs and sockets are used. These plugs have fixed or sliding sheaths or other devices to protect the user from accidental contact with live conductors, but are still largely compatible with the original design. When inserted, the sheaths of the plug and socket overlap fully, ensuring that no live metal is exposed. A typical design is now required (IEC 61010) on multimeter test leads and several other types of measurement and laboratory equipment. In this design, the metal banana plug is entirely sheathed in a plastic tube and inserts into a deeply recessed jack in the multimeter. Alternatively, the equipment may use a deeply recessed male banana plug, while the test lead uses a sheathed banana jack. Additionally, the test lead wire must be made with insulation rated for higher voltages.

In most European countries, the standard mains power receptacle will physically accept banana and even US-style "double banana" plugs (the standard US pin spacing of 3/4 inch (19 mm) is close enough to the mains plug spacing of about 19 mm, and the pin diameter is also compatible), leading to a risk of electrical shock. For this reason, throughout the European Union, audio amplifiers and loudspeakers that accept banana plugs must have plastic plugs in their sockets which can be manually removed by the user. The UK was included in the prohibition even though such mains sockets were not used there.

== See also ==
- Binding post
- Gender of connectors and fasteners
