= Hails =

Hails is a surname. Notable people with the surname include:

- Billy Hails (1935–2017), English footballer
- Julian Hails (born 1967), English footballer and teacher
- Robert Hails (1923–2012), United States Army Air Forces pilot
- Rosie Hails, British population ecologist and entomologist
- William Hails (1766–1845), English writer

== See also ==
- Hail (disambiguation)
- Hals (surname)
