= Hals =

Hals or HALS may refer to:

- Hals (surname)
- Hals Municipality, now in Aalborg, Region Nordjylland, Denmark
- Hals, Denmark
- Hals (company), Norwegian music publishing and piano manufacturing company
- Hals (Passau) the northernmost neighborhood of Passau, Germany
- Historic American Landscapes Survey, a program of the United States National Park Service
- HIV-associated lipodystrophy syndrome, a condition characterized by loss of subcutaneous fat associated with infection with HIV
- Hindered amine light stabilizers, chemicals that prevent light-induced degradation of polymers
- Hertfordshire Archives and Local Studies
- Hals (crater), a crater on Mercury

== See also ==
- Halls (disambiguation)
- Hals Pass
- Halže
