= Halls =

Halls is a plural of the word hall.

Halls may also refer to:

== People ==
- Walter Halls (1871–1953), British trade unionist and politician
- Ethel May Halls (1882–1967), American actress
- Julian Halls (born 1967), British field hockey player
- Evelyn Halls (born 1972), Australian fencer
- Roxana Halls (born 1974), English artist
- Monty Halls (born 1976), British marine biologist and TV presenter
- John Halls (born 1982), English footballer, mostly played for Stoke, Brentford and Aldershot, and model
- Andy Halls (born 1992), English footballer, has played for Stockport, Macclesfield and Chester
- Halls (footballer) (born 1999), Brazilian footballer
- Henrique Halls (born 2002), Brazilian footballer

== Places ==
- Halls, Georgia, an unincorporated community
- Halls, Missouri, an unincorporated community
- Halls, Tennessee, a town in West Tennessee
  - Not to be confused with Halls Crossroads, Tennessee, a suburb of Knoxville sometimes colloquially referred to as "Halls"

== Business ==
- Halls (cough drop), a brand of cough drop
- Geo. Hall & Sons, a defunct Australian soft drink company
- Halls (department store), Kansas City, Missouri, United States
