= Burmester Audiosysteme =

German audio equipment company

Burmester Audiosysteme GmbH
- Type: Private
- Industry: Consumer electronics
- Founded: 1977; 49 years ago
- Founder: Dieter Burmester
- Headquarters: Berlin-Schöneberg, Germany
- Area served: Worldwide
- Key people: Thomas Schneider Thorsten Poenig
- Products: High-end audio components Loudspeakers; Car audio systems
- Number of employees: 100-120
- Website: www.burmester.de

Burmester Audiosysteme GmbH, commonly referred to as Burmester, is a German manufacturer of high-end audio components. The company is based in Berlin-Schöneberg and was founded in 1977 by an Austrian-born musician and engineer Dieter Burmester (1946–2015).

== History ==
Burmester Audiosysteme got its beginning in 1977. As a musician since his early days, Dieter Burmester always wanted to make his audio components and loudspeakers reproduce music as naturally and purely as possible.

It was the malfunction of a faulty preamplifier that caused the development of the first Burmester product. Because the products on the market couldn't satisfy Dieter Burmester's high demands, he built his own preamplifier, the Burmester 777 in July 1977 from parts of medical machines, which he produced in his own engineering office. The 777 is still the core element of Burmester's products and model of the type designation of the following components (composed of the year 77 and the month number 7).

Because the 777 was very successful, Burmester wanted to bring the first hi-fi power amplifier with symmetrical signal routing on the market. This was a novelty for the hi-fi world. However, in the beginning it was difficult to convince retailers and journalists.

By 1978, Burmester Audiosysteme GmbH was fully established. Already in 1978, the company introduced the characteristic chrome design, which has even found its way into the Museum of Modern Art in New York City.

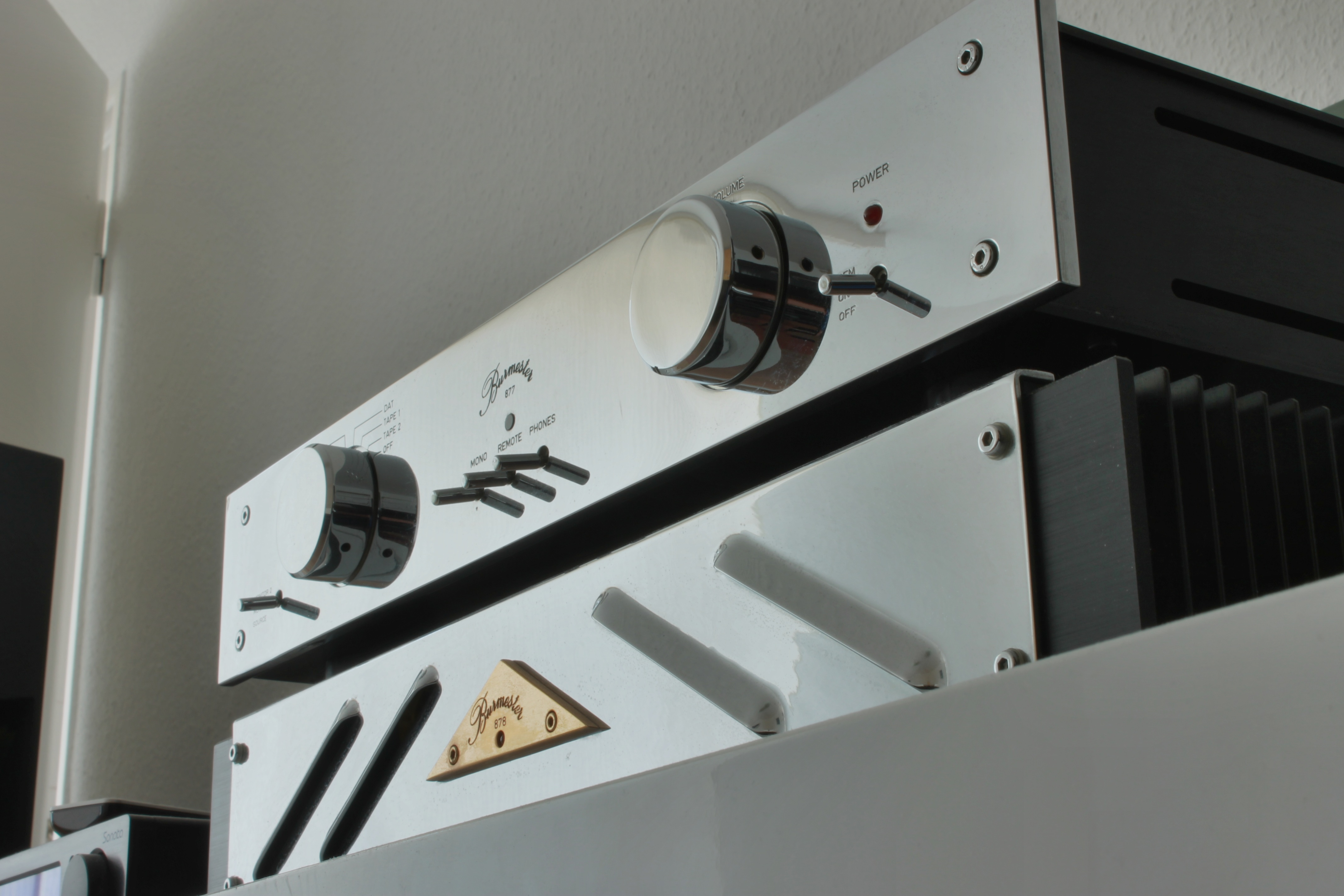
Burmester 877 preamplifier and 878 power amplifier, incorporating the characteristic chrome design

In 1980, Burmester developed and produced the world's first modular preamplifier, the Burmester 808. Further milestones are the symmetrical switching technology, which was first used by Burmester in 1983, the first amplifier with DC coupling from the phono stage through to the speaker terminals and the first remote controlled speaker adjustment with relay circuit resistors, both introduced in 1987. In 1991, the company brought the first belt-driven CD player to the market.

In 1994/1995, Burmester enlarged its portfolio with loudspeakers and brought the first speaker system with a dual active/passive crossover network. In some models they use an air motion transformer as a tweeter, or a particularly large chassis with a diameter of 17 centimetres (6.7 in) for the mid-range frequencies. Also in 1994, Burmester built a universal solution to clean the power supply. By now the manufacturer also offers in-wall loudspeakers and an all-in-one system.

Dieter Burmester was named ‘Entrepreneur of the Year’ in 2003 by the Berlin Association of Independent Business Owners. Burmester Audiosysteme is one of the founding members of the German Manufactories Initiative (Initiative Deutsche Manufakturen), the 'Handmade in Germany' foundation which represents German manufactories of handmade products and craftsmanship.

Dieter Burmester died in August 2015 at the age of 69, after a short but severe illness. After his death, the company was led by his widow Marianne Burmester. On 1 January 2017, Andreas Henke joined as co-CEO of Burmester Audiosysteme.

In 2018, Burmester employed around 100 people. On April 15, 2021, graduate engineer Frank Weise took over as the new Managing Director. Frank Weise stepped down at the end of 2023, while Marianne Burmester resigned from her role as Managing Director on January 1, 2024, transferring responsibility to Thorsten Poenig and Thomas Schneider. However, she remains actively involved as a shareholder in the family business.

== Products ==
In the Home Audio sector, Burmester offers audio components, loudspeakers, and complete systems. Product categories include preamplifiers, power amplifiers, integrated amplifiers, power conditioners, turntables, CD players, network products, and loudspeakers.

Home Audio products are divided into several product lines.

On the company website, these are listed as the Signature Line, Reference Line, Top Line, and Classic Line. The Signature Line comprises top-tier products in the Burmester portfolio. The Reference Line includes various audio components, such as power amplifiers and other high-end equipment. According to the company website, this line features the 909 MK5, 218, and 259 power amplifiers, among others.

According to the company, the Top Line translates the technical concepts of the Reference Line into more compact forms. The Classic Line is positioned with a focus on ease of use and core technical functionality, benefiting technically from developments made in the Reference and Top Lines.

In addition to individual components, Burmester has also offered complete systems since 2018.

All Burmester products are developed in Berlin, manufactured by hand and distributed by dealers in around 50 countries on 5 continents. Most of the component parts are sourced from Germany.

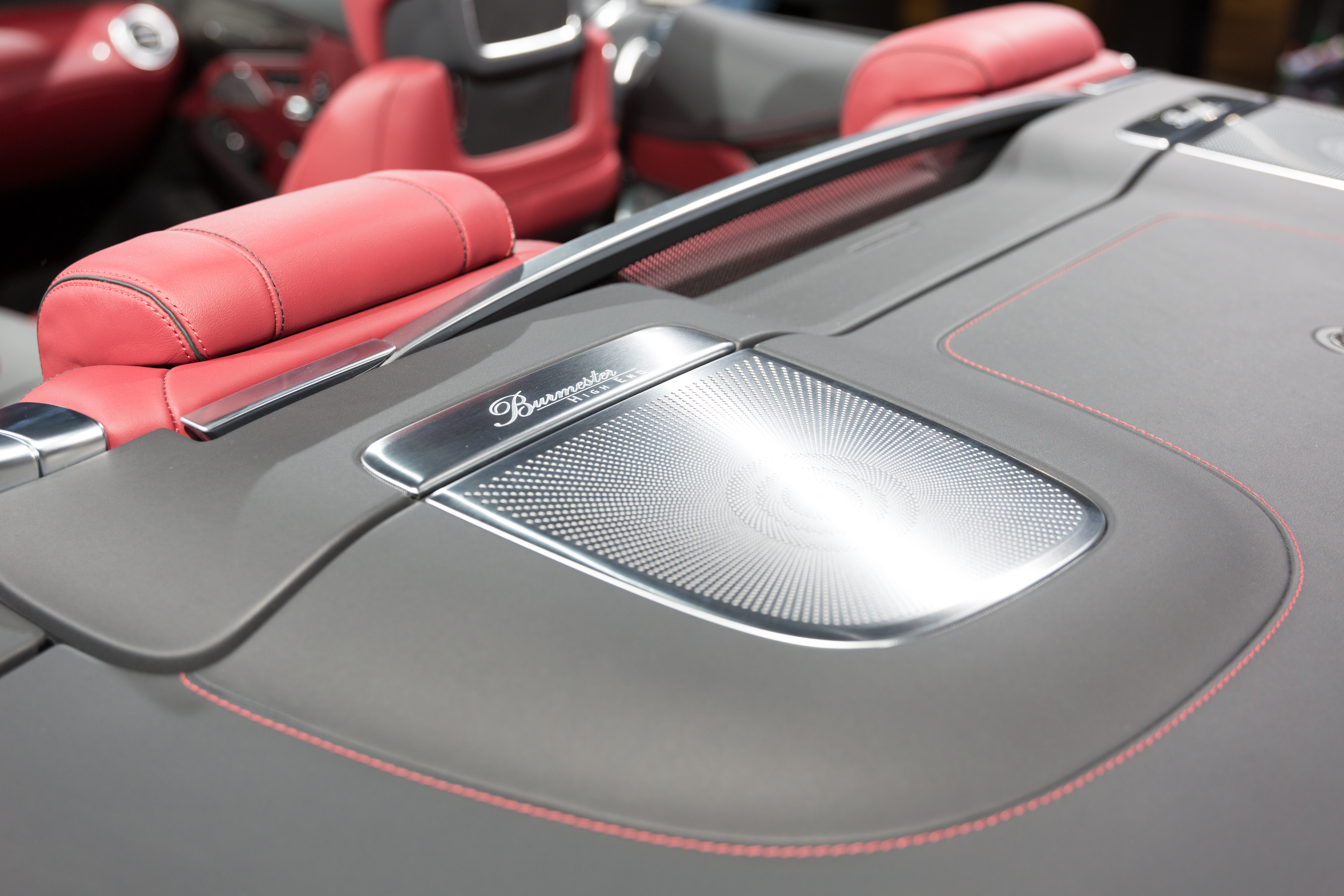
Burmester loudspeakers in a Mercedes-AMG S-Class convertible

== Burmester Automotive ==
Beyond Home Audio, Burmester develops sound systems for vehicles. The Burmester Automotive division was established to develop Hi-Fi audio systems for automobiles. Its automotive partners include Mercedes-Benz, Porsche, Bugatti, and Ferrari.

=== Bugatti ===
Burmester started with a sound system for the Bugatti Veyron.

=== Porsche ===
The collaboration with Porsche began in 2006. With the launch of the Porsche Panamera in 2009, the Burmester High-End Surround Sound System was introduced as an optional audio feature for Porsche. In the following years, Burmester sound systems were developed for additional Porsche models, including the Cayenne, Macan, Panamera, and Taycan featuring the Burmester 3D High-End Surround Sound System, as well as the 911 and 718 featuring the Burmester High-End Surround Sound System.

=== Mercedes-Benz ===
In 2009, Burmester and Mercedes-Benz also launched a development partnership. Together, they developed two new audio systems specifically for the S-Class. In subsequent years, further sound systems followed for the C-Class, V-Class, E-Class, and G-Class. The partnership also spawned audio systems for the Mercedes-AMG GT and the Mercedes-Maybach S-Class.

In late 2020, Burmester released a new innovation together with Mercedes-Benz in the S-Class: the High-End 4D Surround Sound System. Burmester's audio systems in Porsche and Mercedes-Benz vehicles offer various sound presets such as Pure, Smooth, Live, and more. The 3D-mode is only available in the Mercedes-Benz S-Class, the E-Class, the new W177 A-Class and the Porsche Panamera.

=== Ferrari ===
Since 2019, Burmester has also developed sound systems for Ferrari. A Burmester 3D High-End Surround Sound System is used in the Ferrari Purosangue. According to Burmester, the system features 21 speakers including a subwoofer, delivering a total system output of 1,420 watts.
