= Heyl =

Heyl is a surname. Notable people with the surname include:

- Allan Heyl, South African bank robber
- Brett Heyl (born 1981), American slalom canoer
- Charles W. Heyl (1857-1936), American politician
- Henry Renno Heyl (1842–1919), American inventor and chemist
- Jeremy S. Heyl, Canadian astronomer
- Paul R. Heyl (1872–1961), American physicist
- Willy Kaiser-Heyl (1876–1953), German film actor

== See also ==
- HEYL, a gene
- Heil (disambiguation)
