= Heil =

Heil may refer to:

- Heil (surname)
- Heil, North Dakota, a census-designated place and unincorporated community in the United States
- Heil Hitler, Sieg Heil, a Nazi salute
- Heil Sound, a manufacturer of audio and studio equipment
- Heil Environmental Industries, a subsidiary of Dover Corporation that manufactures garbage and recycling trucks
- Heil Heating & Cooling (HVAC) equipment manufacturer; a product line of International Comfort Products Corporation

== See also ==
- Hail (disambiguation)
- Heyl
