= Mick Crawley =

British ecologist

Mick Crawley FRS
- Born: Michael John Crawley; 1949 (age 76–77); Rothbury, Northumberland
- Education: Wharrior Street Primary School, Newcastle Newcastle Cathedral Choir School Longhoughton Primary School Duke's School Alnwick
- Alma mater: University of Edinburgh
- Known for: Long-term field experiments in ecology, concentrating on plant-herbivore interactions
- Scientific career
- Fields: Plant ecology
- Institutions: Imperial College London
- Thesis: (1973)
- Doctoral advisor: Gordon Conway FRS
- Doctoral students: Rosie Hails
- Website: www.bio.ic.ac.uk/research/mjcraw/crawley.htm

Michael John Crawley FRS (born 1949) is a British Emeritus Professor of Plant Ecology at Imperial College London. He is based at Silwood Park campus near Ascot, Berkshire.

His research focuses on the relationship between plants and their herbivores, and on the way that alien plants modify plant community dynamics.

== Publications ==
Crawley has been author or co-author of several books and many scientific papers. These include:

- Clive A. Stace and Michael J. Crawley 2015 Alien Plants New Naturalist Library Book 129. William Collins ISBN 978-0-00-750215-8 640 pp
