= Hail (disambiguation) =

Hail is a form of frozen precipitation.

Hail may also refer to:

== Places ==
- Hail, a city in Saudi Arabia
- Hail Province, a province in Saudi Arabia

== Arts and entertainment ==
- Hail (1972 film), a 1970s American film directed by Fred Levinson
- Hail (2011 film), an Australian drama film
- Hail family of organ builders, 16th and 17th century German family of pipe organ builders

=== Music ===
- Hail (indie band), an indie/punk band
- Hail! (heavy metal band), a heavy metal supergroup
- Hail (album), a 1988 album by Straitjacket Fits
- "Come and Get Your Love", a 1974 song by Redbone, originally released as a promo track titled "Hail"

== Other uses ==
- Hail (horse), a thoroughbred racehorse
- Highways Agency Information Line, in England

== See also ==
- Hail Mary, a traditional Roman Catholic and Eastern Orthodox prayer calling for the intercession of Mary, the mother of Jesus
- Hails, a surname
- Heil (disambiguation)
