= Heil (surname) =

Heil is a surname. Notable people with the surname include:

- Bob Heil (1940–2024), American sound and radio engineer, founder of Heil Sound
- Hubertus Heil (born 1972), German politician
- Jennifer Heil (born 1983), Canadian freestyle skier
- Jerry Heil (born 1995), Ukrainian singer
- John Heil (born 1943), American philosopher
- Julius P. Heil (1876–1949), American politician, 30th governor of the State of Wisconsin
- Manon Heil (born 1997), French association football player
- Mechthild Heil (born 1961), German politician
- Oskar Heil (1908–1994), German electrical engineer, inventor of the air motion transformer
- Reinhold Heil (born 1954), German-American composer
