= HEYL =

Protein-coding gene in humans

Identifiers
- Aliases: HEYL, HESR3, HEY3, HRT3, bHLHb33, hes related family bHLH transcription factor with YRPW motif-like, hes related family bHLH transcription factor with YRPW motif like
- External IDs: OMIM: 609034; MGI: 1860511; GeneCards: HEYL

Gene location (Human)
Chr.	Chromosome 1 (human)
Band	1p34.2	Start	39,623,435 bp
Band	1p34.2	End	39,639,643 bp

Gene location (Mouse)
Chr.	Chromosome 4 (mouse)
Band	4|4 D2.2	Start	123,127,349 bp
Band	4|4 D2.2	End	123,143,668 bp
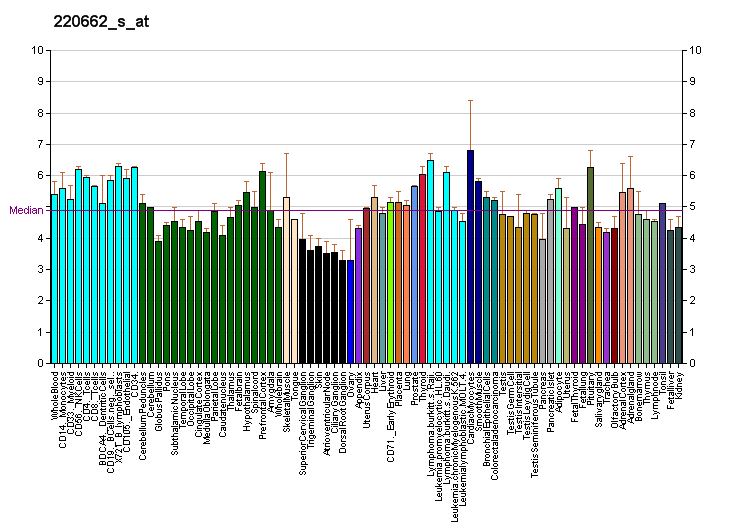
RNA expression pattern
Bgee	Human / Mouse (ortholog); Top expressed in: right coronary artery; left coronary artery; body of pancreas; tibial arteries; ascending aorta; apex of heart; right auricle of heart; Descending thoracic aorta; right lung; left ventricle / Top expressed in: ascending aorta; vasculature of trunk; external carotid artery; aortic valve; internal carotid artery; pelvic ganglion; spinal nerve; urethra; female urethra; tunica media of zone of aorta; More reference expression data
BioGPS	More reference expression data
Gene ontology
Molecular function	microsatellite binding; DNA binding; sequence-specific DNA binding; transcription corepressor activity; protein dimerization activity; protein homodimerization activity; DNA-binding transcription factor activity; DNA-binding transcription activator activity, RNA polymerase II-specific; transcription factor binding; protein binding; protein heterodimerization activity; AF-1 domain binding; RNA polymerase II core promoter sequence-specific DNA binding; RNA polymerase II general transcription initiation factor activity; DNA-binding transcription factor activity, RNA polymerase II-specific; RNA polymerase II cis-regulatory region sequence-specific DNA binding; RNA polymerase II transcription regulatory region sequence-specific DNA binding; DNA-binding transcription repressor activity, RNA polymerase II-specific; sequence-specific double-stranded DNA binding
Cellular component	nucleoplasm; nucleus; cytoplasm
Biological process	regulation of transcription, DNA-templated; negative regulation of androgen receptor signaling pathway; cellular response to BMP stimulus; glomerulus development; transcription by RNA polymerase II; negative regulation of gene expression; transcription, DNA-templated; multicellular organism development; proximal tubule development; skeletal muscle cell differentiation; Notch signaling pathway; negative regulation of transcription by RNA polymerase II; positive regulation of neuron differentiation; positive regulation of transcription by RNA polymerase II; outflow tract morphogenesis; atrioventricular valve morphogenesis; cardiac ventricle morphogenesis; cardiac epithelial to mesenchymal transition; mesenchymal cell development; pulmonary valve morphogenesis; epithelial to mesenchymal transition involved in endocardial cushion formation; ventricular septum morphogenesis; endocardial cushion morphogenesis; negative regulation of transcription, DNA-templated; positive regulation of transcription of Notch receptor target; blood vessel development; development of the heart; cell differentiation; regulation of neurogenesis; negative regulation of DNA-binding transcription factor activity; aortic valve morphogenesis; Notch signaling involved in heart development; anterior/posterior pattern specification; circulatory system development
Sources:Amigo / QuickGO
Orthologs
Databases	NCBI: entry; OMA: entry
Species	Human	Mouse
Entrez	26508	56198
Ensembl	ENSG00000163909	ENSMUSG00000032744
UniProt	Q9NQ87	Q9DBX7
RefSeq (mRNA)	NM_014571	NM_013905
RefSeq (protein)	NP_055386	NP_038933
Location (UCSC)	Chr 1: 39.62 – 39.64 Mb	Chr 4: 123.13 – 123.14 Mb
PubMed search
- Wikidata
View/Edit Human	View/Edit Mouse

Hairy/enhancer-of-split related with YRPW motif-like protein is a protein that in humans is encoded by the HEYL gene.

This gene encodes a member of the hairy and enhancer of split-related (HESR) family of basic helix-loop-helix (bHLH)-type transcription factors. The sequence of the encoded protein contains a conserved bHLH and orange domain, but its YRPW motif has diverged from other HESR family members. It is thought to be an effector of Notch signaling and a regulator of cell fate decisions. Alternatively spliced transcript variants have been found, but their biological validity has not been determined.
