= Halls (footballer) =

Brazilian footballer (born 1999)

Personal information
- Full name: Hedhe Halls Rocha da Silva
- Date of birth: 17 June 1999 (age 27)
- Place of birth: Nova Iguaçu, Brazil
- Height: 1.95 m (6 ft 5 in)
- Position: Goalkeeper

Team information
- Current team: Kyoto Sanga (on loan from Vila Nova)
- Number: 90

Youth career
- –2020: Vasco da Gama

Senior career*
Years	Team	Apps	(Gls)
2020–2024	Vasco da Gama	8	(0)
2020–2021	→ Náutico (loan)	2	(0)
2021	→ Boa Esporte (loan)	3	(0)
2024	→ Vila Nova (loan)	2	(0)
2025–	Vila Nova	43	(0)
2026	→ Sport Recife (loan)	6	(0)
2026–	→ Kyoto Sanga (loan)	4	(0)
- * Club domestic league appearances and goals as of 11 September 2026

Hedhe Halls Rocha da Silva (born 17 June 1999), commonly known as Halls, is a Brazilian footballer who plays as a goalkeeper for Kyoto Sanga, on loan from Vila Nova.

== Personal life ==
Halls' younger brother, named Henrique and also known as Halls, is also a footballer. A central defender, he plays for Red Bull Bragantino.

== Career statistics ==
=== Club ===
As of 7 June 2020.

Club	Season	League			State league		Cup		Continental		Other		Total	
Club	Season	Division	Apps	Goals	Apps	Goals	Apps	Goals	Apps	Goals	Apps	Goals	Apps	Goals
Vasco da Gama	2020	Série A	0	0	0	0	0	0	0	0	0	0	0	0
Náutico (loan)	2020	Série B	0	0	1 (Note: Appearances in the Campeonato Pernambucano)	0	0	0	–		0	0	1	0
Career total			0	0	1	0	0	0	0	0	0	0	1	0
