= Henrique Halls =

Brazilian footballer (born 2002)

Personal information
- Full name: Henrique Halls Rocha da Silva
- Date of birth: 4 February 2002 (age 24)
- Place of birth: Nova Iguaçu, Brazil
- Position: Centre back

Team information
- Current team: Democrata

Youth career
- Vasco da Gama
- 2019: Nova Iguaçu
- 2020–2022: Resende

Senior career*
Years	Team	Apps	(Gls)
2021–2022	Resende	4	(0)
2022–2025	Red Bull Bragantino	0	(0)
2025	→ Tubarão (loan)		
2026–	Democrata	2	(0)
- * Club domestic league appearances and goals as of 15:29, 8 February 2026 (UTC)

Henrique Halls Rocha da Silva (born 4 February 2002), known as Henrique Halls or just Halls, is a Brazilian professional footballer who plays as a central defender for Democrata.

== Club career ==
Born in Nova Iguaçu, Rio de Janeiro, Halls played for Vasco da Gama, Nova Iguaçu and Resende as a youth. He made his first team debut for the latter on 24 April 2021, coming on as a late substitute in a 1–3 Campeonato Carioca home loss against Vasco.

On 9 December 2021, Halls renewed his contract until September 2025. The following 10 February, he moved to Red Bull Bragantino, after the club acquired 50% of his economic rights.

== Personal life ==
Halls' older brother, named Hedhe and also known as Halls, is also a footballer. A goalkeeper, he plays for Vasco.

== Career statistics ==
As of match played 22 January 2026

Appearances and goals by club, season and competition
Club	Season	League			State league		Copa do Brasil		Continental		Other		Total	
Club	Season	Division	Apps	Goals	Apps	Goals	Apps	Goals	Apps	Goals	Apps	Goals	Apps	Goals
Resende	2021	Carioca	—		1	0	—		—		4 (Note: Appearances in Copa Rio)	1	5	1
Resende	2022	Carioca	—		3	0	—		—		—		3	0
Resende	Total		—		4	0	—		—		4	1	8	1
Democrata	2026	Série D	0	0	2 (Note: Appearances in Campeonato Mineiro)	0	0	0	—		—		0	0
Career total			0	0	6	0	0	0	0	0	4	1	10	1
