= Rosie Hails =

British population ecologist

Rosie Hails MBE FRSB FRES
- Born: Rosemary S. Hails
- Education: University of Oxford (BA); Imperial College London (PhD)
- Scientific career
- Fields: Population ecology; Entomology
- Workplaces: National Trust; Centre for Ecology & Hydrology
- Thesis: The ecology of Andricus quercuscalicis and its natural enemies (1988)
- Doctoral advisor: Mick Crawley

Rosemary S. Hails MBE FRSB FRES is a British population ecologist and entomologist and the current Director of Science and Nature at the National Trust for Places of Historic Interest or Natural Beauty. Prior to this appointment she was the Director of Biodiversity and Ecosystem Science for UK Centre for Ecology and Hydrology, managing and directing the science of 350 ecologists and hydrologists, in collaboration with the Science Director for Water and Pollution Science. Professor Hails successfully led the development of UKCEH's national capability research programme delivered by the Research Centre, which cuts across the complete portfolio of expertise. She has led the Valuing Nature Programme for NERC, since October 2014, and is currently a CoInvestigator in the NERC Funded "RENEW" and "RestReco" Projects. In 2000, she was made a Member of the Most Excellent Order of the British Empire (MBE) for services to environmental research.

She is a member of the Department for Environment Food and Rural Affairs' (DEFRA) Science Advisory Council, providing independent expert advice on Science policy and strategy to DEFRA. As part of this team, she chairs a subgroup which is currently advising the development of the legally binding targets for biodiversity, under the 25 year Environment Plan. She is also a trustee and Member of Council for the Royal Society for the Protection of Birds (RSPB) and the John Innes Foundation. Hails' past roles include; at Defra - Chair of the Advisory Committee on Releases to the Environment, Membership of the Natural Capital Committee (NCC), the Bovine tuberculosis eradication advisory group (TBEAG); the Expert Advisory Panel for the Climate Change Risk Assessment Working Group; Member of the Natural Environment Research Council (NERC) Science Board, and is a former Vice Chair of the British Ecological Society, chairing the Grants Committee. She was a co-founder of the Natural Capital Initiative.
