= William Hails =

William Anthony Hails or Hailes (1766–1845) was an English miscellaneous writer.

== Life ==
The son of a shipwright, he was born at Newcastle upon Tyne on 24 May 1766. An accident in his childhood prevented him from attending school until his eleventh year. He learnt the alphabet from an old church prayer-book, and his father taught him writing and arithmetic. He remained at school only three years, after which he worked as a shipwright for sixteen years.

He acquired a good knowledge of Latin and Greek, and also studied Hebrew, together with some other oriental languages. He wrote several papers for the Classical Journal and contributed to the Gentleman's Magazine and Monthly Magazine. Hails ultimately became a schoolmaster at Newcastle, but had only moderate success. He was a Wesleyan Methodist, and preached occasionally in the chapel of his sect at Newcastle. He died at Newcastle on 30 August 1845.

== Bibliography ==
=== Works by the author ===
1. Nugae Poeticae Newcastle upon Tyne (?), 1806;
2. An Enquiry concerning the Invention of the Life Boat, claiming William Wouldhave of South Shields to be the inventor, Newcastle, 1806;
3. A Voice from the Ocean, Newcastle (?), 1807;
4. Tract No. 6, published by the Society for the Propagation of Christianity among the Jews, 1809;
5. The Pre-existence and Deity of the Messiah defended on the indubitable evidence of the Prophets and Apostles.
6. Socinianism unscriptural. Being an examination of Mr. Campbell's attempt to explode the Scripture Doctrine of human depravity, the Atonement, &c., two pamphlets on the Socinian controversy, both published at Newcastle in 1813;
7. The Scorner reproved, Newcastle, 1817.
8. A letter to the Rev. W. Turner. Occasioned by the publication of Two Discourses preached by him at the 6th Annual Meeting of the Association of Scottish Unitarian Christians, Newcastle,. 1818. A second 'Letter' was published in the following year;
9. Remarks on Volney's "Ruins", or a Survey of the Revolutions of Empires 1825;
10. The First Commandment: a Discourse. Newcastle, 1827;
11. A Letter to C. Larkin, in reply to his Letter to W. Chapman on Transubstantiation. Newcastle, 1831.

Many of Hails's writings evoked published replies.

=== Works about the author ===
- E. Mackenzie, History of Newcastle, i. 403-4
- John Latimer, Local Records of Northumberland and Durham (Newcastle, 1857), p. 204.1
