= Holtzer-Cabot =

Former American automobile manufacturer

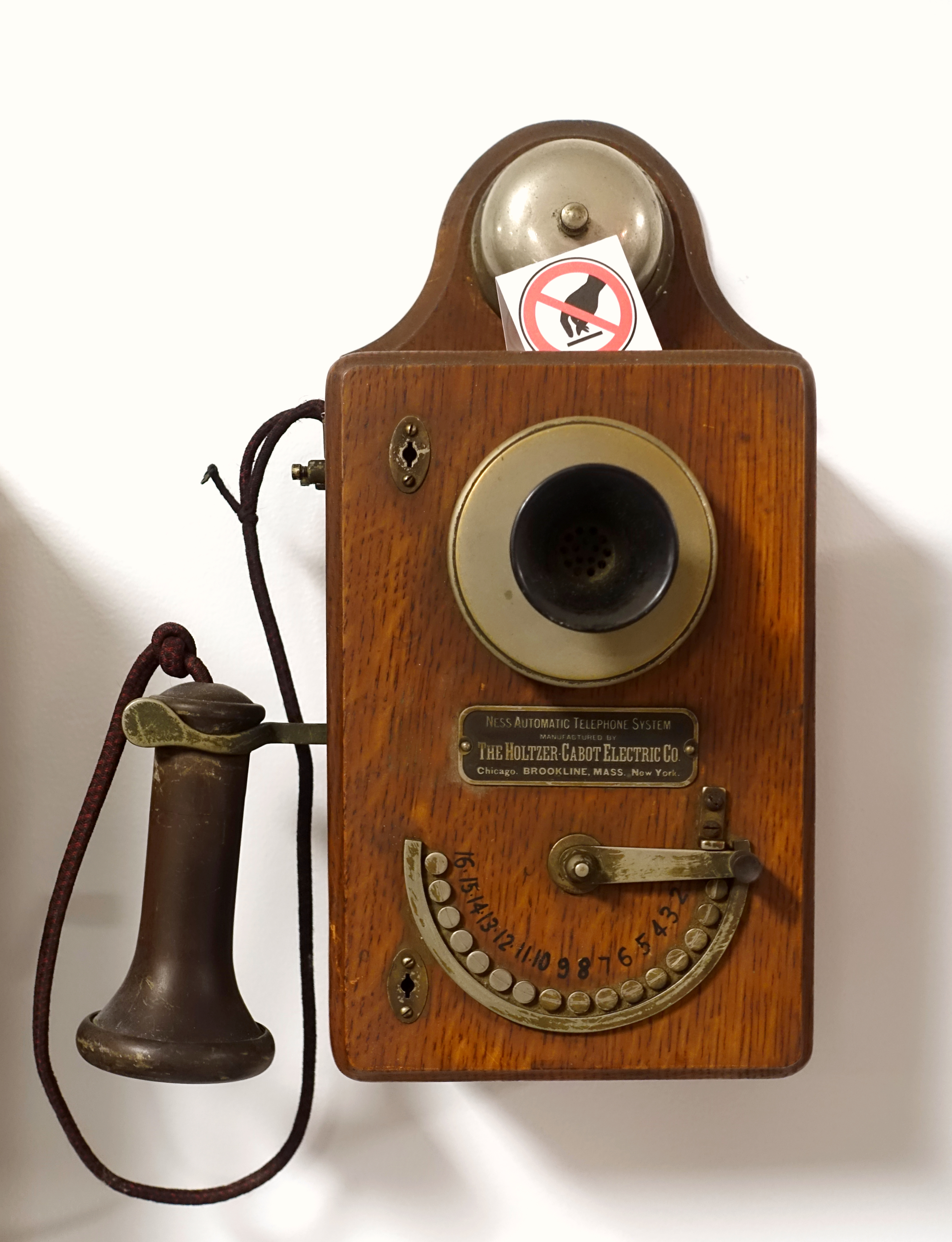
Ness Automatic Telephone System, manufactured by Holtzer-Cabot, c. 1900–1910

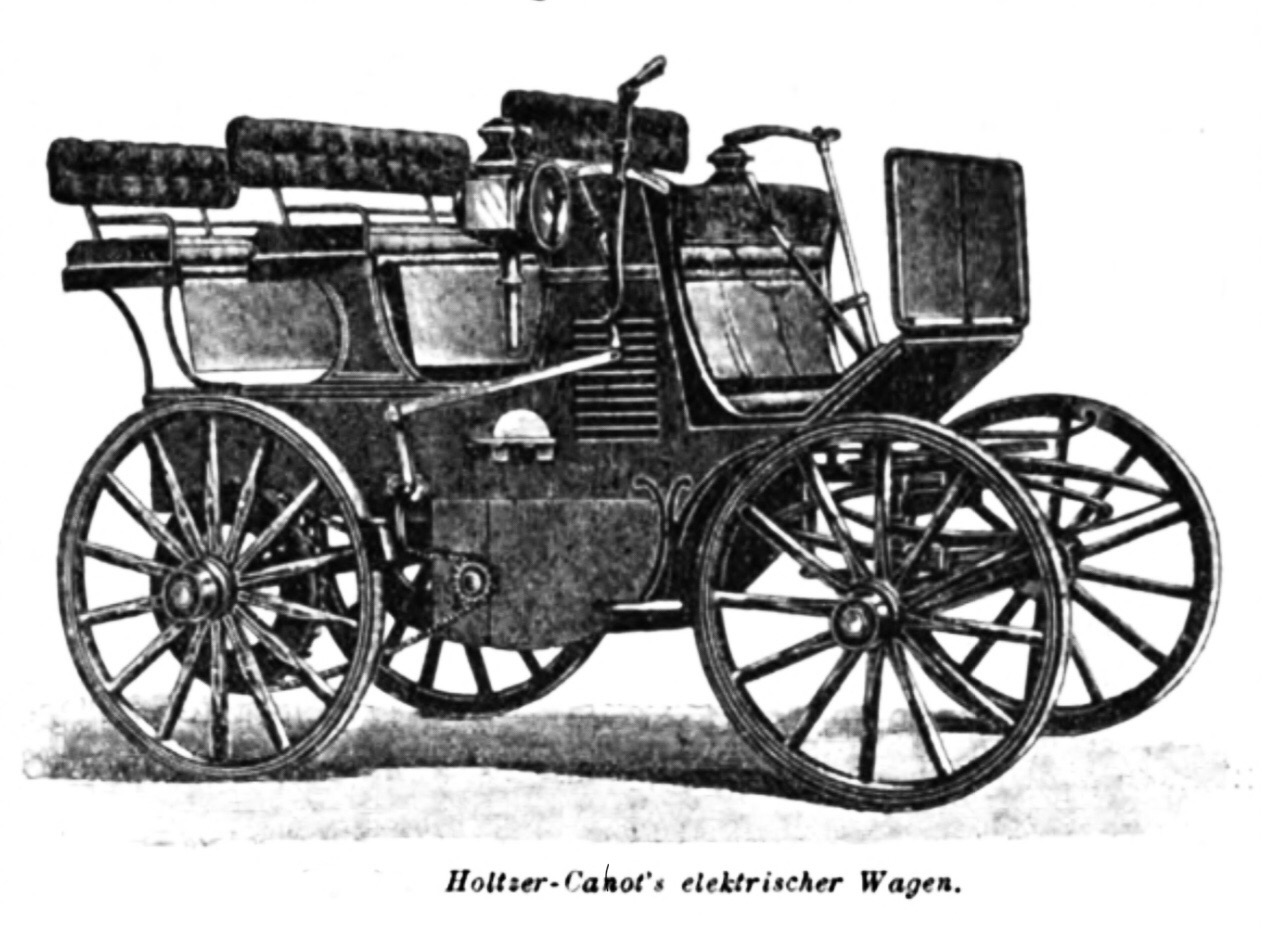
Holtzer-Cabot 5,5 kW (1892).

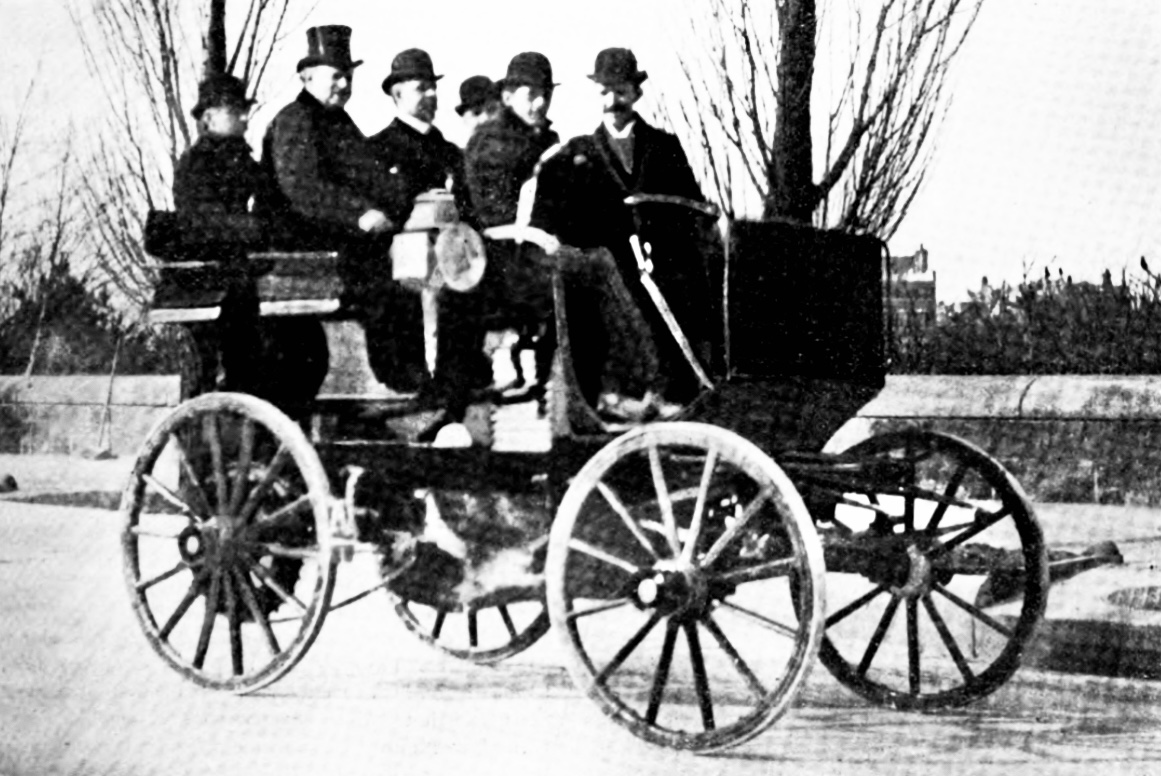
Holtzer-Cabot 7HP (1895).

Holtzer-Cabot was a Boston, MA company founded in 1875. They specialized in small motors, fire alarm systems, telegraph-related products, and various other electric devices. The company closed in 1972.

== History ==
Charles Holtzer founded the company as "Holtzer Co." and began manufacturing simple electrical devices such as doorbells and electric igniters. In 1880, Seth W. Fuller partnered with Holtzer, and the company became known as "Seth W. Fuller & Holtzer", and later as "Fuller, Holtzer & Company". George E. Cabot joined the business, and Fuller left in 1889. The company then changed its name to "Holtzer-Cabot", which remained their name until their closing. In 1891, the company built an electric car that sat four people and moved approximately 16 MPH. It was the first to feature a steering wheel, and is known as the first successful electric vehicle in America, though other unsuccessful prototypes had been built before. Around the turn of the 20th century, the company branched out to create various telephone/telegraph-related products, clocks, and fire alarm systems. They invented the first shunt-type fire alarm system, where a local alarm pulled in a building would also trigger the nearest municipal street fire alarm box. Most of their fire alarm systems were installed in hospitals, factories, and institutions. In 1927, Charles Holtzer died. Throughout World War II, the company branched out even more, but struggled to retain business. In 1972, the company officially closed and sold the remainder of their lines to Eastern Air Devices based in Dover NH (Now known as Electrocraft). The original factory in Jamaica Plain, MA still exists, but has now been converted to an apartment complex.
