= Hals Pass =

Mountain pass in the Austrian Alps

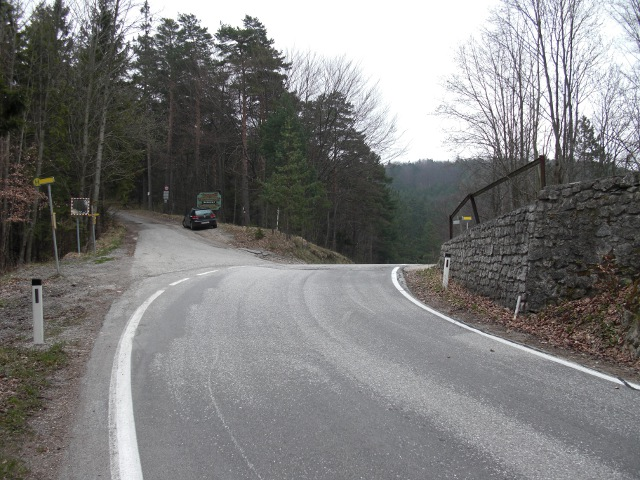
- Summit

- Location within Alps
- Elevation: 662 metres (2,172 ft)
- Traversed by: L138

Third Approach
- Location: Austria
- Range: Alps
- Coordinates: 47°55′38″N 15°59′17″E

Hals Pass (el. 662 m [2,172 ft]) is a low mountain pass in the Austrian Alps in the Bundesland of Lower Austria.

It connects the Triesting River valley near Pottenstein with the Piesting River valley near Pernitz.

The road was built in 1828.

== See also ==
- List of highest paved roads in Europe
- List of mountain passes
