= Hals (surname) =

Hals is a German and Dutch surname, originally a nickname for someone with a long neck or a sufferer of goitres. Notable people with surname include:

- Dirck Hals (1591–1656), Dutch painter
- Frans Hals (c.1582–1666), Dutch painter
- William Hals (1655–1737), British historian
