= Air Motion Transformer =

Type of loudspeaker

The Air Motion Transformer (AMT) is a type of electroacoustic transducer. Invented by Oskar Heil (1908–1994), it operates on a different transduction principle from other loudspeaker designs, such as moving coil, planar magnetic or electrostatically-driven loudspeakers, and should not be confused with planar or true ribbon loudspeakers. In contrast to a planar ribbon loudspeaker, the diaphragm of the AMT is of pleated shape similar to a bellows. The AMT moves air laterally in a perpendicular motion using a metal-etched folded sheet made of polyethylene terephthalate (PET) film. The circuit path embossed on the PET membrane, acts as the voice coil unit. The diaphragm (now, as a unit) is then housed between 4 stacks of steel pole-plate pieces positioned at 45° within a high-intensity, quadratic, opposing magnetic field. The air motion transformer with its sheet film equally exposed at 180° behaves as a dipole speaker, exciting front and rear sonic waves simultaneously.

== How it works ==
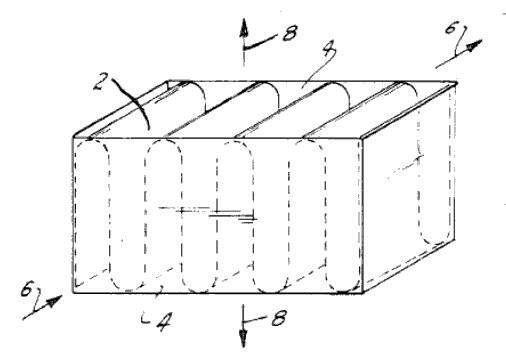
Current through the membrane 2 causes it to move left and right in the magnetic field 6, moving air in and out along directions 8; barriers 4 prevent air from moving in unintended directions.

The diaphragm pushes back and forward from itself in a physical motion similar to that observed when an accordion is pushed in and pulled out to pump air through the reed chambers, albeit over an exceedingly smaller motion range. The result is a dipole driver with an extraordinarily rapid response rate, enabled by the extremely low mass of the polyethylene substrate and the far smaller distance it travels on each "swing" compared to a dynamic driver. In this technical respect, it shares characteristics with an electrostatic driver.

The discernible motion of each diaphragm flexure is very small, but because of the folded structure, more air is moved than would be by a conventional cone or electrostatic driver of the same plotted surface area. As a matter of surface comparison, a standard 1-inch-wide (25 mm) AMT strip has a functional driver area comparable to an 8-inch-diameter (200 mm) circular dynamic cone. The folded driver design, combined with the small motion range, means the AMT acts like a point source version of a larger driver, inherently resulting in lower sound reproduction distortion. The speed of the air as it leaves the diaphragm is approximately five times faster than the speed of the actual driver structure, hence the name Air Motion Transformer.

== Application and use ==
While suited very well for high frequencies, the AMT can reproduce sound down to 650 Hz. Consequently, the most common use for the AMT driver in consumer electronics today is as a midrange-tweeter or tweeter in high-end multi-driver speakers, sometimes paired with horns, or in the case of Precide's speaker products, with an upward-firing woofer driver.

In the tweeter market, the AMT competes against electrostatic, ribbon and electrodynamic tweeters. While apparently very good as a mid-tweeter or full tweeter, the AMT is not commonly employed in lower frequency speakers. This is due mainly to the AMT's characteristics of a dipole sound radiator, which makes enclosure in traditional speaker cabinets difficult without sacrificing sound quality or employing sound reflex baffles. Crossover points are design decisions (depending on the model application, using a cut-off frequency of 18 dB at 800 Hz, or 1 kHz).

In the headphone market, HEDD audio has developed the HEDDphone which utilizes AMT drivers. The drivers use a specially developed diaphragm with folds varying in width and depth. This technique called Variable Velocity Transform allows the AMT drivers to extend down to 10 Hz and function as full range headphones.

== Consumer products ==
The AMT was first used in 1972 by ESS (ElectroStatic Sound Systems), a California company based in Sacramento. The first speaker was aptly named AMT1. Appearing as a short lopped pyramid, the system combined the AMT transducer with a 10-inch ported woofer. The big brother to the AMT1 was named AMT1Tower. This cabinet design employed a transmission line labyrinth for the woofer. Subsequent designs of AMT cabinets replaced the smaller woofer with a 12-inch woofer and passive radiator. This gave the speaker better low-frequency response characteristics. Another consumer favorite named AMT3, also known as Rock Monitor, was a configuration using 1 AMT, a 6.5-inch mid-range and twin 10-inch woofers.

Consumers were able to get components from the Sacramento-based company until 2006. From 2006 to 2008, air motion transformers were made available directly to the European consumer as the company closed its doors in California and relocated to Germany. A new line of modern audiophile speakers utilizing the AMT were then offered as well. After failing to meet sales projections, the company then relocated back to California. From 2009 to the present they now source all component manufacturing to mainland China, with one exception being the membrane, a polyester film now used in all applications. Polyester film is purported to be of greater longevity, while the original polyethylene remains popular due to critical acclaim of its response characteristics. Although all patents for AMT design expired by mid-2004, the company continues to produce speakers using the same technology. Some adornments and style changes were employed in attempts to increase sales, which have been met with considerable consumer consternation. The AMT design enjoys a small following of enthusiasts worldwide, mostly as a stand-alone accoutrement to existing end-user arrangements.
