= Plasma speaker =

Loudspeaker

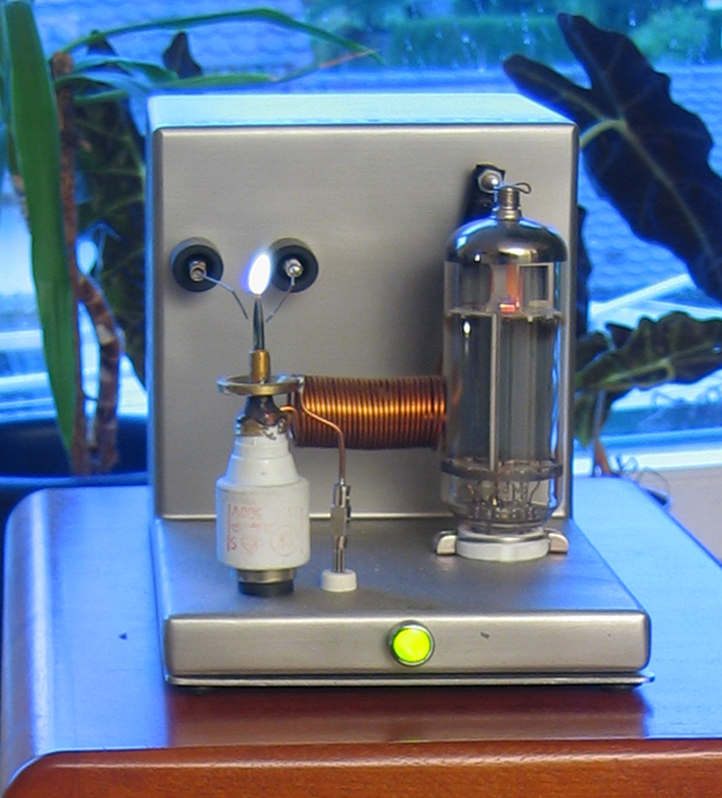
Plasma speaker

Plasma speakers or ionophones are a form of loudspeaker which varies air pressure via an electrical plasma instead of a solid diaphragm. The plasma arc heats the surrounding air causing it to expand. Varying the electrical signal that drives the plasma and connected to the output of an audio amplifier, the plasma size varies which in turn varies the expansion of the surrounding air creating sound waves.

The plasma is typically in the form of a glow discharge and acts as a massless radiating element. The technique is a much later development of physics principles demonstrated by William Duddell's "singing arc" of 1900, and Hermann Theodor Simon published the same phenomenon in 1898.

The term ionophone was used by Dr. Siegfried Klein who developed a plasma tweeter that was licensed for commercial production by DuKane with the Ionovac and Fane Acoustics with the Ionofane in the late 1940s and 1950s.

The effect takes advantage of several physical principles: First, ionization of a gas creates a highly conductive plasma, which responds to alternating electric and magnetic fields. Second, this low-density plasma has a negligibly small mass. Thus, the air remains mechanically coupled with the essentially massless plasma, allowing it to radiate a nearly ideal reproduction of the sound source when the electric or magnetic field is modulated with the audio signal.

== Comparison to conventional loudspeakers ==
Conventional loudspeaker transducer designs use the input electrical audio frequency signal to vibrate a significant mass: In a dynamic loudspeaker this driver is coupled to a stiff speaker cone—a diaphragm which pushes air at audio frequencies. But the inertia inherent in its mass resists acceleration—and all changes in cone position. Additionally, speaker cones will eventually suffer tensile fatigue from the repeated shaking of sonic vibration.

Thus conventional speaker output, or the fidelity of the device, is distorted by physical limitations inherent in its design. These distortions have long been the limiting factor in commercial reproduction of strong high frequencies. To a lesser extent square wave characteristics are also problematic; the reproduction of square waves most stress a speaker cone.

In a plasma speaker, as member of the family of massless speakers, these limitations do not exist. The low-inertia driver has exceptional transient response compared to other designs. The result is an even output, accurate even at higher frequencies beyond the human audible range. Such speakers are notable for accuracy and clarity, but not lower frequencies because plasma is composed of tiny molecules and with such low mass are unable to move large volumes of air unless the plasmas are large in number. So these designs are more effective as tweeters.

== Practical considerations ==
Plasma speaker designs ionize ambient air which contains the gases nitrogen and oxygen. In an intense electrical field these gases can produce reactive by-products, and in closed rooms these can reach a hazardous level. The two predominant gases produced are ozone and nitrogen dioxide.

Plasmatronics produced a commercial plasma speaker that used a helium tank to provide the ionization gas. In 1978 Alan E. Hill of the Air Force Weapons Laboratory in Albuquerque, NM, designed the Plasmatronics Hill Type I, a commercial helium-plasma tweeter. This avoided the ozone and nitrogen oxides produced by radio frequency decomposition of air in earlier generations of plasma tweeters. But the operation of such speakers requires a continuous supply of helium.

In the 1950s, the pioneering DuKane Corporation produced the air-ionizing Ionovac, marketed in the UK as the Ionophone. Currently there remain manufacturers in Germany who use this design, as well as many do-it-yourself designs available on the Internet.

To make the plasma speaker a more widely available product, ExcelPhysics, a Seattle-based company, and Images Scientific Instruments, a New York-based company, both offered their own variant of the plasma speaker as a DIY kit. The ExcelPhysics variant used a flyback transformer to step up voltage, a 555 timing chip to provide modulation and a 44 kHz carrier signal, and an audio amplifier. The kit is no longer marketed.

A flame speaker uses a modulated flame for the driver and could be considered related to the plasma loudspeaker. This was explored using the combustion of natural gas or candles to produce a plasma through which current is then passed. These combustion designs do not require high voltages to generate a plasma field, but there has been no commercial products using them.

A similar effect is occasionally observed in the vicinity of high-power amplitude-modulated radio transmitters when a corona discharge (inadvertently) occurs from the transmitting antenna, where voltages in the tens of thousands volts are involved. The ionized air is heated in direct relationship to the modulating signal with surprisingly high fidelity over a wide area. Due to the destructive effects of the (self-sustaining) discharge this cannot be permitted to persist, and automatic systems momentarily shut down transmission within a few seconds to quench the "flame".

== See also ==
- Singing Tesla coil
