= Chester Williams Rice =

American electrical acoustics engineer (1888–1951)

Chester Williams Rice (December 16, 1888 – March 8, 1951) was an American electrical engineer who was the joint inventor in 1925 of the moving coil loudspeaker along with Edward W. Kellogg.

== Career ==
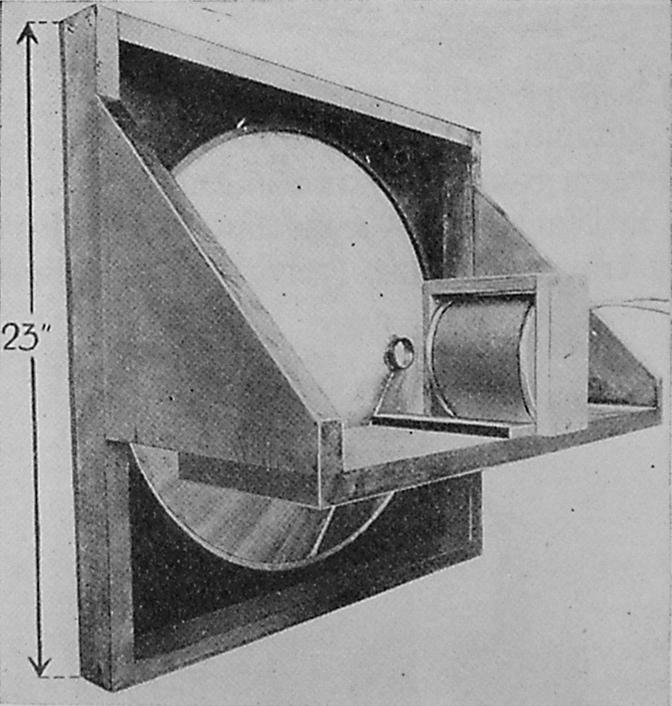
The first moving coil cone loudspeaker, developed by Chester W. Rice and Edward W. Kellogg at General Electric Laboratory in Schenectady, New York in 1925

Rice was born in Lynn, Massachusetts in 1888 and educated at The Albany Academy and Harvard College, from which he received an S.B. and an M.E.E. in 1911. He was later employed by General Electric in Schenectady, New York.

In 1925, Rice, while working for General Electric, published a paper with Edward W. Kellogg outlining an early moving coil loudspeaker. The paper also discussed a way of boosting power to amplifiers; this was incorporated in General Electric's Radiola line of radios in 1926.

== Personal ==
Rice married Helen Currier of Lynn in 1914. They had five children, Barbara, Wilbur Currier, Priscilla, Chester Thomson and Helen.
