= Loudspeaker =

Converts an electrical audio signal into a corresponding sound

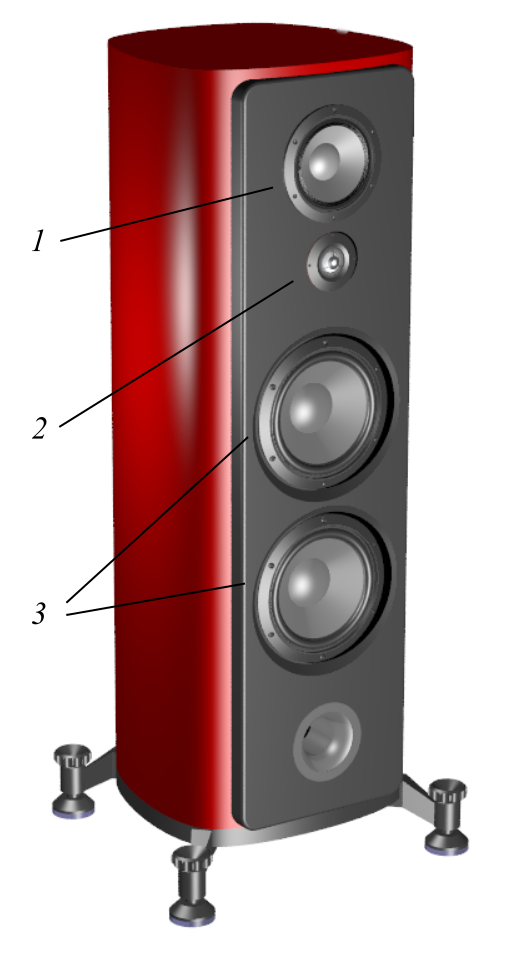
Hi-fi speaker system for home use with three types of dynamic drivers: 1. Mid-range driver; 2. Tweeter; 3. Woofers; The hole below the lowest woofer is a port for a bass reflex system.

A loudspeaker (commonly referred to as a speaker or, more fully, a speaker system) is a combination of one or more speaker drivers, an enclosure, and electrical connections (possibly including a crossover network). The speaker driver is an electroacoustic transducer that converts an electrical audio signal into a corresponding sound.

The driver is a linear motor connected to a diaphragm, which transmits the motor's movement to produce sound by moving air. An audio signal, typically originating from a microphone, recording, or radio broadcast, is electronically amplified to a power level sufficient to drive the motor, reproducing the sound corresponding to the original unamplified signal. This process functions as the inverse of a microphone. In fact, the dynamic speaker driver—the most common type—shares the same basic configuration as a dynamic microphone, which operates in reverse as a generator.

The dynamic speaker was invented in 1925 by Edward W. Kellogg and Chester W. Rice. When the electrical current from an audio signal passes through its voice coil—a coil of wire capable of moving axially in a cylindrical gap containing a concentrated magnetic field produced by a permanent magnet—the coil is forced to move rapidly back and forth due to Faraday's law of induction; this attaches to a diaphragm or speaker cone (as it is usually conically shaped for sturdiness) in contact with air, thus creating sound waves. In addition to dynamic speakers, several other technologies are possible for creating sound from an electrical signal, a few of which are in commercial use.

For a speaker to efficiently produce sound, especially at lower frequencies, the speaker driver must be baffled so that the sound emanating from its rear does not cancel out the (intended) sound from the front; this generally takes the form of a speaker enclosure or speaker cabinet, an often rectangular box made of wood, but sometimes metal or plastic. The enclosure's design plays an important acoustic role, thus determining the resulting sound quality. Most high fidelity speaker systems (picture at right) include two or more sorts of speaker drivers, each specialized in one part of the audible frequency range. The smaller drivers capable of reproducing the highest audio frequencies are tweeters, those for middle frequencies are mid-range speakers and those for low frequencies are woofers. In a two-way or three-way speaker system (one with drivers covering two or three different frequency ranges), there is a small amount of passive electronics called a crossover network which helps direct components of the electronic signal to the speaker drivers best capable of reproducing those frequencies. In a powered speaker system, the power amplifier actually feeding the speaker drivers is built into the enclosure itself; these have become more and more common, especially as computer and Bluetooth speakers.

Smaller speakers are found in devices such as radios, televisions, portable audio players, personal computers (computer speakers), headphones, and earphones. Larger, louder speaker systems are used for home hi-fi systems (stereos), electronic musical instruments, sound reinforcement in theaters and concert halls, and in public address systems.

== Terminology ==
The term loudspeaker may refer to individual transducers (also known as drivers) or to complete speaker systems consisting of an enclosure and one or more drivers.

To adequately and accurately reproduce a wide range of frequencies with even coverage, most loudspeaker systems employ more than one driver, particularly for higher sound pressure level (SPL) or maximum accuracy. Individual drivers are used to reproduce different frequency ranges. The drivers are named subwoofers (for very low frequencies); woofers (low frequencies); mid-range speakers (middle frequencies); tweeters (high frequencies); and sometimes supertweeters, for the highest audible frequencies and beyond. The terms for different speaker drivers differ, depending on the application. In two-way systems there is no mid-range driver, so the task of reproducing the mid-range sounds is divided between the woofer and tweeter. When multiple drivers are used in a system, a filter network, called an audio crossover, separates the incoming signal into different frequency ranges and routes them to the appropriate driver. A loudspeaker system with n separate frequency bands is described as n-way speakers: a two-way system will have a woofer and a tweeter; a three-way system employs a woofer, a mid-range, and a tweeter. Loudspeaker drivers of the type pictured are termed dynamic (short for electrodynamic) to distinguish them from other sorts including moving iron speakers, and speakers using piezoelectric or electrostatic systems.

== History ==
Johann Philipp Reis installed an electric loudspeaker in his telephone in 1861; it was capable of reproducing clear tones, but later revisions could also reproduce muffled speech. Alexander Graham Bell patented his first electric loudspeaker (a moving iron type capable of reproducing intelligible speech) as part of his telephone in 1876, which was followed in 1877 by an improved version from Ernst Siemens. During this time, Thomas Edison was issued a British patent for a system using compressed air as an amplifying mechanism for his early cylinder phonographs, but he ultimately settled for the familiar metal horn driven by a membrane attached to the stylus. In 1898, Horace Short patented a design for a loudspeaker driven by compressed air; he then sold the rights to Charles Parsons, who was issued several additional British patents before 1910. A few companies, including the Victor Talking Machine Company and Pathé, produced record players using compressed-air loudspeakers. Compressed-air designs are significantly limited by their poor sound quality and their inability to reproduce sound at low volume. Variants of the design were used for public address applications, and more recently, other variations have been used to test space-equipment resistance to the very loud sound and vibration levels that the launching of rockets produces.

=== Moving-coil ===
The first experimental moving-coil (also called dynamic) loudspeaker was invented by Oliver Lodge in 1898. The first practical moving-coil loudspeakers were manufactured by Danish engineer Peter L. Jensen and Edwin Pridham in 1915, in Napa, California. Like previous loudspeakers these used horns to amplify the sound produced by a small diaphragm. Jensen was denied patents. Being unsuccessful in selling their product to telephone companies, in 1915 they changed their target market to radios and public address systems, and named their product Magnavox. Jensen was, for years after the invention of the loudspeaker, a part owner of The Magnavox Company.

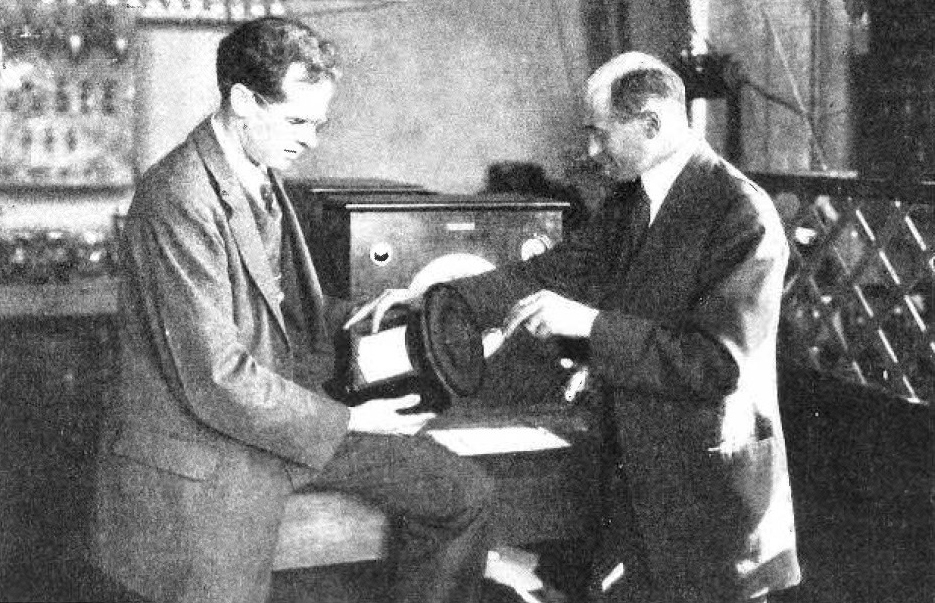
Kellogg and Rice in 1925 holding the large driver of the first moving-coil cone loudspeaker

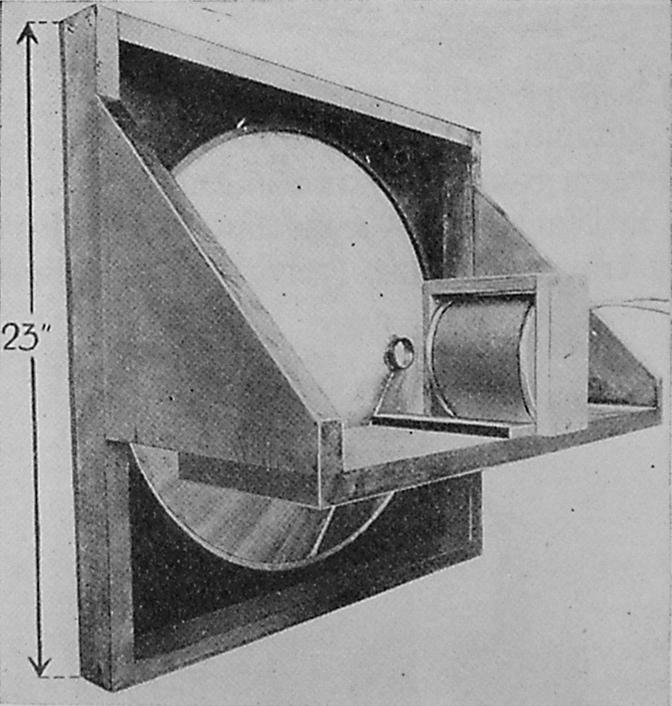
Prototype moving-coil cone loudspeaker by Kellogg and Rice in 1925, with electromagnet pulled back, showing voice coil attached to cone

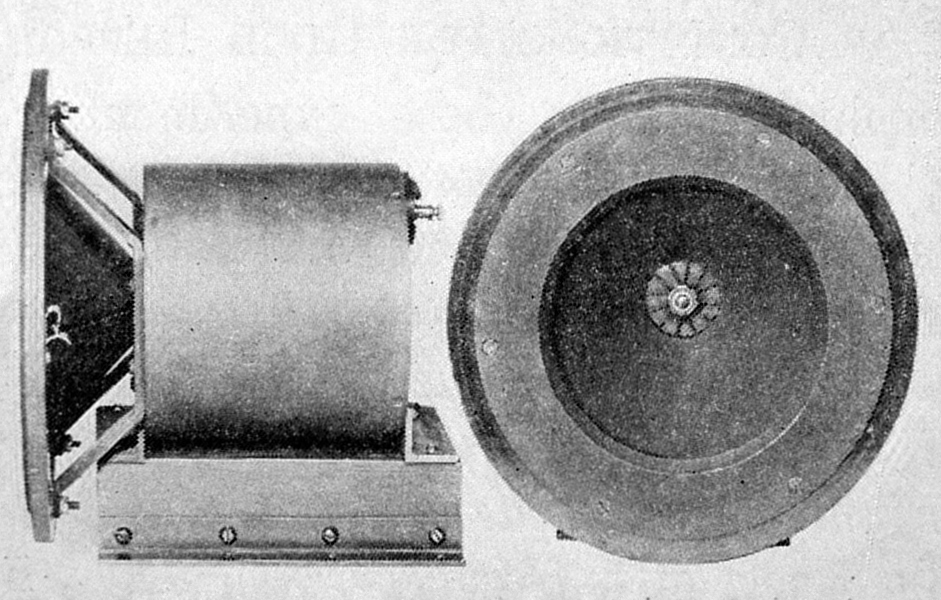
The first commercial version of the speaker, sold with the RCA Radiola receiver, had only a six-inch cone. In 1926 it sold for $250, equivalent to about $3000 today.

The moving-coil principle commonly used today in speakers was patented in 1925 by Edward W. Kellogg and Chester W. Rice. The key difference between previous attempts and the patent by Rice and Kellogg is the adjustment of mechanical parameters to provide a reasonably flat frequency response.

These first loudspeakers used electromagnets, because large, powerful permanent magnets were generally not available at a reasonable price. The coil of an electromagnet, called a field coil, was energized by a current through a second pair of connections to the driver. This winding usually served a dual role, acting also as a choke coil, filtering the power supply of the amplifier that the loudspeaker was connected to. AC ripple in the current was attenuated by the action of passing through the choke coil. However, AC line frequencies tended to modulate the audio signal going to the voice coil and added to the audible hum. In 1930 Jensen introduced the first commercial fixed-magnet loudspeaker; however, the large, heavy iron magnets of the day were impractical and field-coil speakers remained predominant until the widespread availability of lightweight alnico magnets after World War II.

=== First loudspeaker systems ===
In the 1930s, loudspeaker manufacturers began to combine two and three drivers or sets of drivers each optimized for a different frequency range in order to improve frequency response and increase sound pressure level. In 1937, the first film industry-standard loudspeaker system, the Shearer Horn System for Theatres, a two-way system, was developed under the auspices of Metro-Goldwyn-Mayer. It used four 15-inch low-frequency drivers, a crossover network set for 375 Hz, and a single multi-cellular horn with two compression drivers providing the high frequencies. John Kenneth Hilliard, James Bullough Lansing, and Douglas Shearer all played roles in creating the system. At the 1939 New York World's Fair, a very large two-way public address system was mounted on a tower at Flushing Meadows. The eight 27-inch low-frequency drivers were designed by Rudy Bozak in his role as chief engineer for Cinaudagraph.

Altec Lansing introduced the 604, which became their most famous coaxial Duplex driver, in 1943. It incorporated a high-frequency horn that sent sound through a hole in the pole piece of a 15-inch woofer for near-point-source performance. Altec's "Voice of the Theatre" loudspeaker system was first sold in 1945, offering better coherence and clarity at the high output levels necessary in movie theaters. The Academy of Motion Picture Arts and Sciences immediately began testing its sonic characteristics; they made it the film house industry standard in 1955.

In 1954, Edgar Villchur developed the acoustic suspension principle of loudspeaker design. This allowed for better bass response than previously obtainable from drivers mounted in larger cabinets. He and his partner Henry Kloss formed the Acoustic Research company to manufacture and market speaker systems using this principle. Subsequently, continuous developments in enclosure design and materials led to significant audible improvements.

The most notable improvements to date in modern dynamic drivers, and the loudspeakers that employ them, are improvements in cone materials, the introduction of higher-temperature adhesives, improved permanent magnet materials, improved measurement techniques, computer-aided design, and finite element analysis. At low frequencies, Thiele/Small parameters electrical network theory has been used to optimize bass driver and enclosure synergy since the early 1970s.

== Driver design: dynamic loudspeakers ==
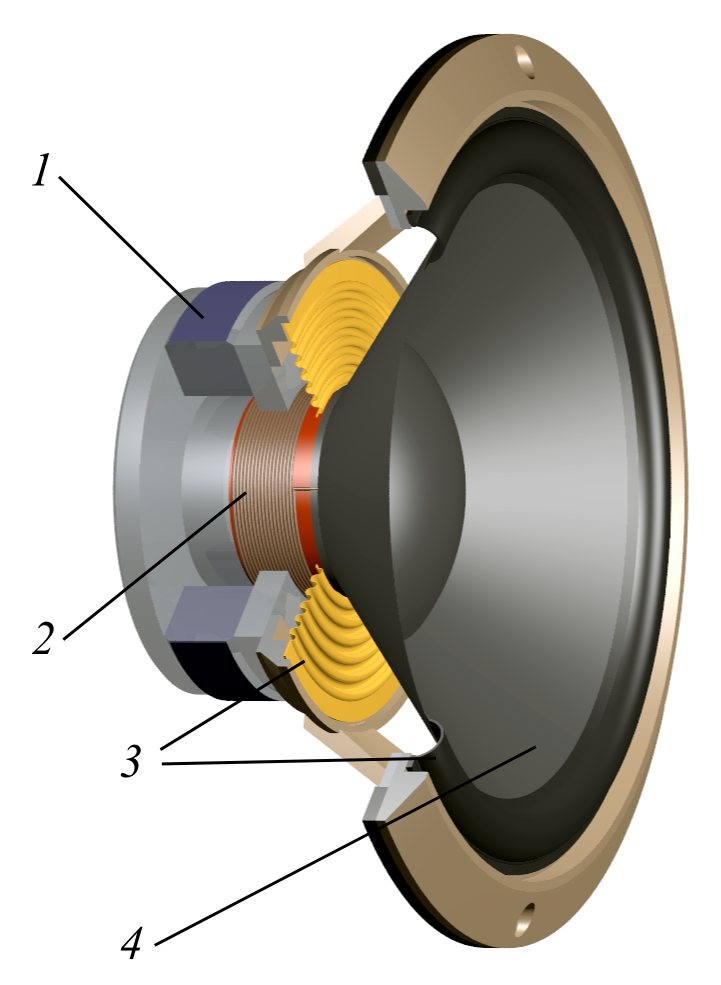
Cutaway view of a dynamic loudspeaker for the bass register: 1. Magnet; 2. Voice coil; 3. Suspension; 4. Diaphragm

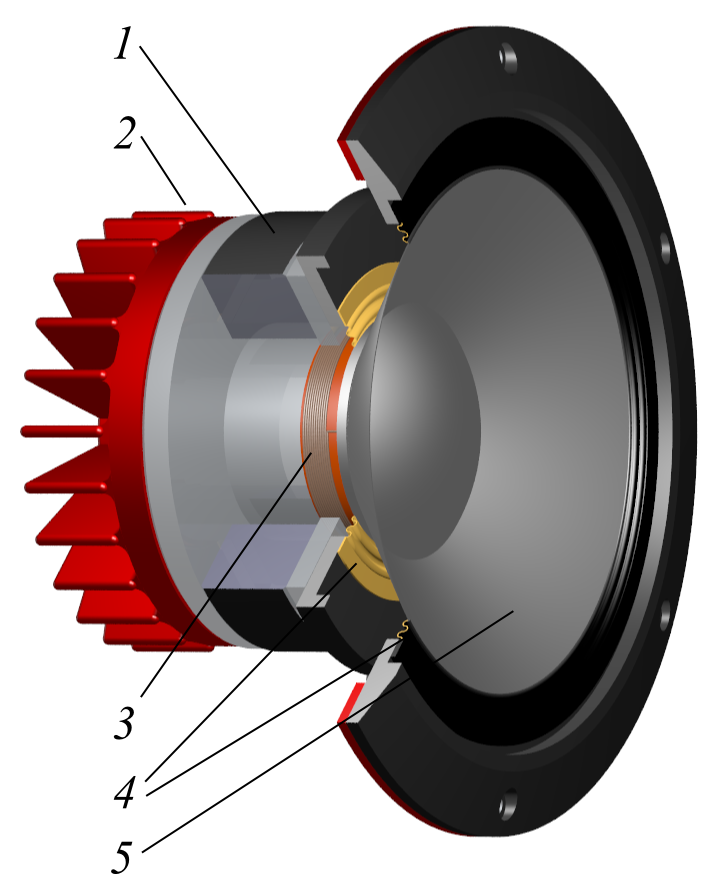
Cutaway view of a dynamic midrange speaker: 1. Magnet; 2. Cooler (sometimes present); 3. Voice coil; 4. Suspension; 5. Diaphragm

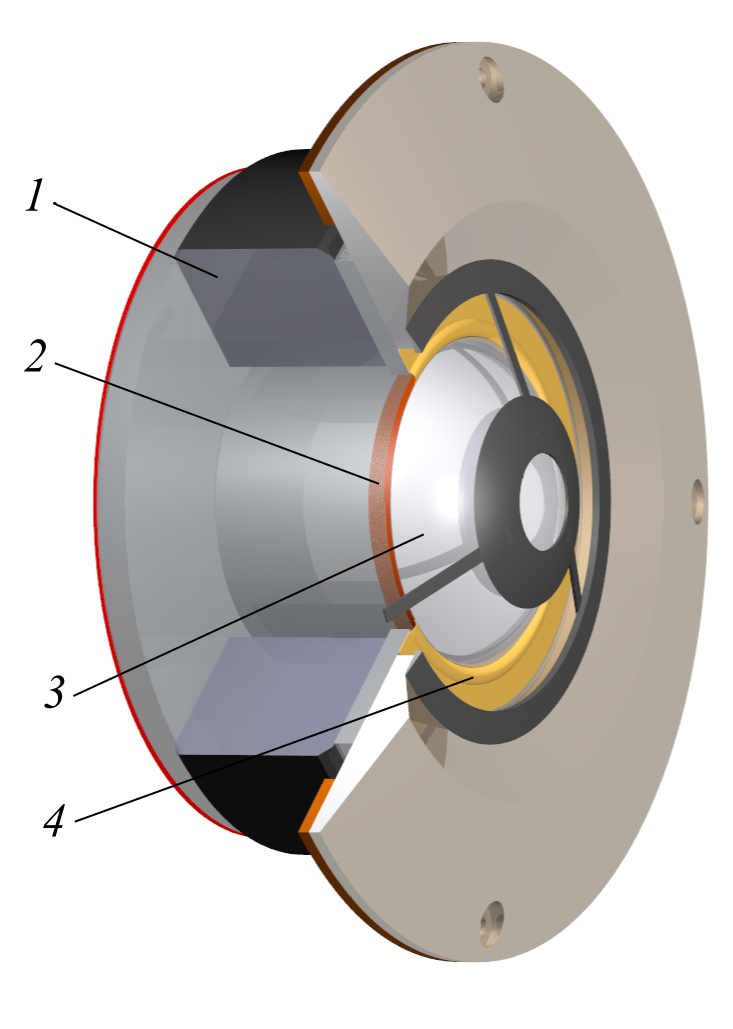
Cutaway view of a dynamic tweeter with acoustic lens and a dome-shaped membrane: 1. Magnet; 2. Voice coil; 3. Diaphragm; 4. Suspension

Diagram showing how sound data turns into sound waves: A computer representation of sound data is turned into an electrical current, which creates an electromagnetic force, which moves a speaker diaphragm, which creates sound waves. Note that since the driver is a driven damped harmonic oscillator, the position of the driver doesn't directly match the electric current.

The most common type of driver, commonly called a dynamic loudspeaker, uses a lightweight diaphragm, or cone, connected to a rigid basket, or frame, via a flexible suspension, commonly called a spider, that constrains a voice coil to move axially through a cylindrical magnetic gap. A protective dust cap glued in the cone's center prevents dust, most importantly ferromagnetic debris, from entering the gap.

When an electrical signal is applied to the voice coil, a magnetic field is created by the electric current in the voice coil, making it a variable electromagnet. The coil and the driver's magnetic system interact in a manner similar to a solenoid, generating a mechanical force that moves the coil (and thus, the attached cone). Application of alternating current moves the cone back and forth, accelerating and reproducing sound under the control of the applied electrical signal coming from the amplifier.

The following is a description of the individual components of this type of loudspeaker.

=== Diaphragm ===
The diaphragm is usually manufactured with a cone- or dome-shaped profile. A variety of different materials may be used, but the most common are paper, plastic, and metal. The ideal material is rigid, to prevent uncontrolled cone motions, has low mass to minimize starting force requirements and energy storage issues and is well damped to reduce vibrations continuing after the signal has stopped with little or no audible ringing due to its resonance frequency as determined by its usage. In practice, all three of these criteria cannot be met simultaneously using existing materials; thus, driver design involves trade-offs. For example, paper is light and typically well-damped, but is not stiff; metal may be stiff and light, but it usually has poor damping; plastic can be light, but typically, the stiffer it is made, the poorer the damping. As a result, many cones are made of some sort of composite material. For example, a cone might be made of cellulose paper, into which some carbon fiber, Kevlar, glass, hemp or bamboo fibers have been added; or it might use a honeycomb sandwich construction; or a coating might be applied to it so as to provide additional stiffening or damping.

=== Basket ===
The chassis, frame, or basket is designed to be rigid, preventing deformation that could change critical alignments with the magnet gap, perhaps allowing the voice coil to rub against the magnet around the gap. Chassis are typically cast from aluminum alloy, in heavier magnet-structure speakers; or stamped from thin sheet steel in lighter-structure drivers. Other materials such as molded plastic and damped plastic compound baskets are becoming common, especially for inexpensive, low-mass drivers. A metallic chassis can play an important role in conducting heat away from the voice coil; heating during operation changes resistance, causes physical dimensional changes, and if extreme, burns the varnish on the voice coil; it may even demagnetize permanent magnets.

=== Suspension ===
The suspension system keeps the coil centered in the gap and provides a restoring (centering) force that returns the cone to a neutral position after moving. A typical suspension system consists of two parts: the spider, which connects the diaphragm or voice coil to the lower frame and provides the majority of the restoring force, and the surround, which helps center the coil/cone assembly and allows free pistonic motion aligned with the magnetic gap. The spider is usually made of a corrugated fabric disk, impregnated with a stiffening resin. The name comes from the shape of early suspensions, which were two concentric rings of Bakelite material, joined by six or eight curved legs. Variations of this topology included the addition of a felt disc to provide a barrier to particles that might otherwise cause the voice coil to rub.

The cone surround can be rubber or polyester foam, treated paper or a ring of corrugated, resin-coated fabric; it is attached to both the outer cone circumference and to the upper frame. These diverse surround materials, their shape and treatment can dramatically affect the acoustic output of a driver; each implementation has advantages and disadvantages. Polyester foam, for example, is lightweight and economical, though usually leaks air to some degree and is degraded by time, exposure to ozone, UV light, humidity and elevated temperatures, limiting useful life before failure.

=== Voice coil ===
The wire in a voice coil is usually made of copper, though aluminum—and, rarely, silver—may be used. The advantage of aluminum is its light weight, which reduces the moving mass compared to copper. This raises the resonant frequency of the speaker and increases its efficiency. A disadvantage of aluminum is that it is not easily soldered, and so connections must be robustly crimped together and sealed. Voice-coil wire cross sections can be circular, rectangular, or hexagonal, giving varying amounts of wire volume coverage in the magnetic gap space. The coil is oriented co-axially inside the gap; it moves back and forth within a small circular volume (a hole, slot, or groove) in the magnetic structure. The gap establishes a concentrated magnetic field between the two poles of a permanent magnet; the outside ring of the gap is one pole, and the center post (called the pole piece) is the other. The pole piece and backplate are often made as a single piece, called the poleplate or yoke.

=== Magnet ===
The size and type of magnet and details of the magnetic circuit differ, depending on design goals. For instance, the shape of the pole piece affects the magnetic interaction between the voice coil and the magnetic field, and is sometimes used to modify a driver's behavior. A shorting ring, or Faraday loop, may be included as a thin copper cap fitted over the pole tip or as a heavy ring situated within the magnet-pole cavity. The benefits of this complication are reduced impedance at high frequencies, providing extended treble output, reduced harmonic distortion, and a reduction in the inductance modulation that typically accompanies large voice coil excursions. On the other hand, the copper cap requires a wider voice-coil gap, with increased magnetic reluctance; this reduces available flux, requiring a larger magnet for equivalent performance.

Electromagnets were often used in musical instrument amplifiers cabinets well into the 1950s; there were economic savings in those using tube amplifiers as the field coil could, and usually did, do double duty as a power supply choke. Very few manufacturers still produce electrodynamic loudspeakers with electrically powered field coils, as was common in the earliest designs.

Alnico, an alloy of aluminum, nickel, and cobalt, became popular after WWII, since it dispensed with the problems of field-coil drivers. Alnico was commonly used until the 1960s, despite the problem of alnico magnets being partially demagnetized. In the 1960s, most driver manufacturers switched from alnico to ferrite magnets, which are made from a mix of ceramic clay and fine particles of barium or strontium ferrite. Although the energy per kilogram of these ceramic magnets is lower than alnico, it is substantially less expensive, allowing designers to use larger yet more economical magnets to achieve a given performance. Due to increases in transportation costs and a desire for smaller, lighter devices, there is a trend toward the use of more compact rare-earth magnets made from materials such as neodymium and samarium cobalt.

== Speaker systems ==
Speaker system design involves subjective perceptions of timbre and sound quality, measurements and experiments. Adjusting a design to improve performance is done using a combination of magnetic, acoustic, mechanical, electrical, and materials science theory, and tracked with high-precision measurements and the observations of experienced listeners. A few of the issues speaker and driver designers must confront are distortion, acoustic lobing, phase effects, off-axis response, and crossover artifacts. Designers can use an anechoic chamber to ensure the speaker can be measured independently of room effects, or any of several electronic techniques that, to some extent, substitute for such chambers. Some developers eschew anechoic chambers in favor of specific standardized room setups intended to simulate real-life listening conditions.

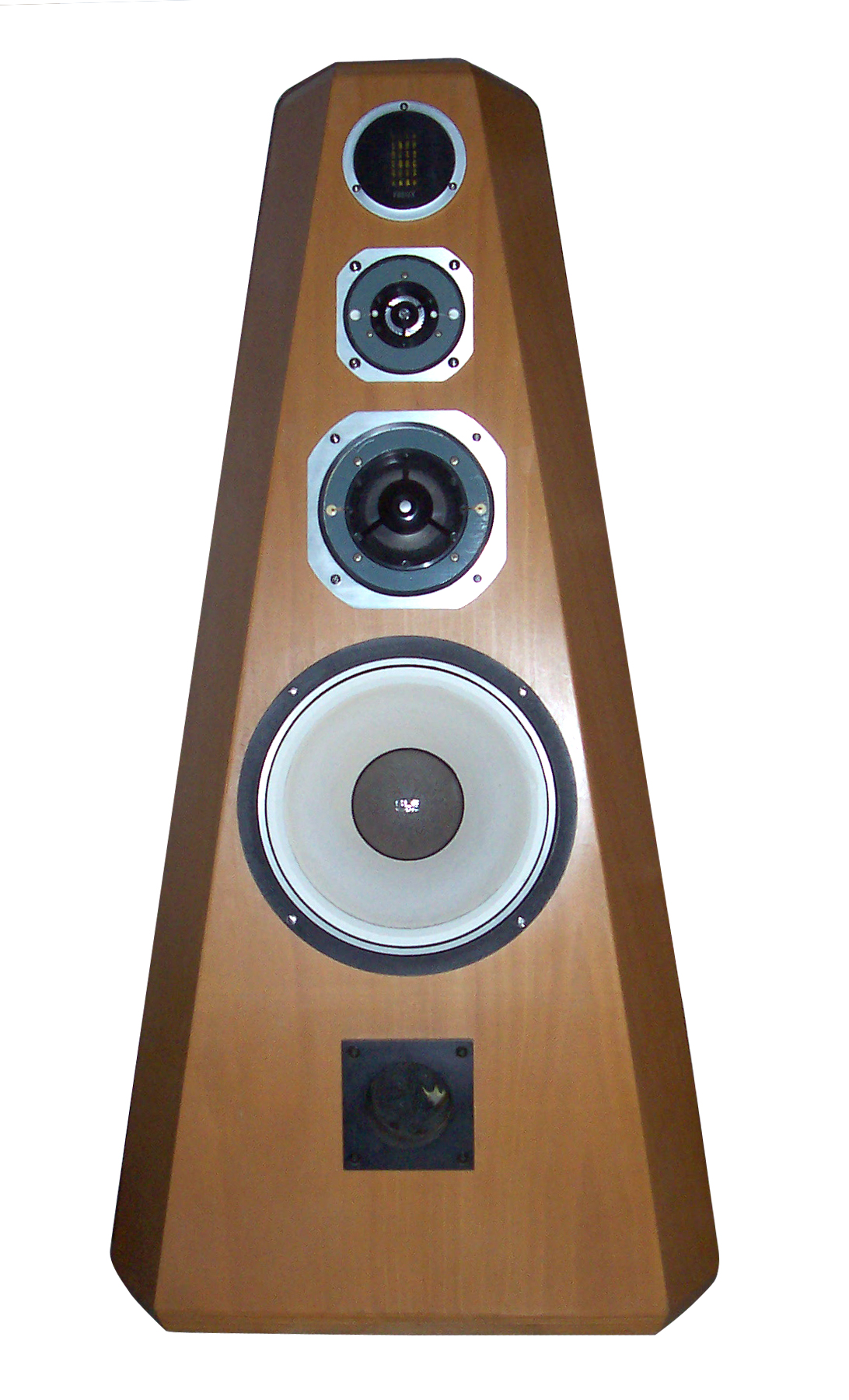
A four-way, high fidelity loudspeaker system. Each of the four drivers outputs a different frequency range; the fifth aperture at the bottom is a bass reflex port.

Individual electrodynamic drivers provide their best performance within a limited frequency range. Multiple drivers (e.g. subwoofers, woofers, mid-range drivers, and tweeters) are generally combined into a complete loudspeaker system to provide performance beyond that constraint. The three most commonly used sound radiation systems are the cone, dome and horn-type drivers.

=== Full-range drivers ===
A full- or wide-range driver is a speaker driver designed to be used alone to reproduce an audio channel without the help of other drivers and therefore must cover the audio frequency range required by the application. These drivers are small, typically 3 to 8 inches (7.6 to 20.3 cm) in diameter to permit reasonable high-frequency response, and carefully designed to give low-distortion output at low frequencies, though with reduced maximum output level. Full-range drivers are found, for instance, in public address systems, in televisions, small radios, intercoms, and some computer speakers.

In hi-fi speaker systems, the use of wide-range drivers can avoid undesirable interactions between multiple drivers caused by non-coincident driver location or crossover network issues but also may limit frequency response and output abilities (most especially at low frequencies). Hi-fi speaker systems built with wide-range drivers may require large, elaborate or, expensive enclosures to approach optimum performance.

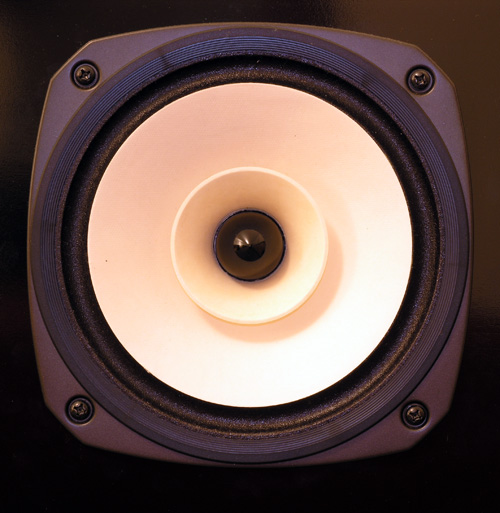
A full-range drive unit loudspeaker using a whizzer cone

Full-range drivers often employ an additional cone called a whizzer: a small, light cone attached to the joint between the voice coil and the primary cone. The whizzer cone extends the high-frequency response of the driver and broadens its high-frequency directivity, which would otherwise be greatly narrowed due to the outer diameter cone material failing to keep up with the central voice coil at higher frequencies. The main cone in a whizzer design is manufactured so as to flex more in the outer diameter than in the center. The result is that the main cone delivers low frequencies and the whizzer cone contributes most of the higher frequencies. Since the whizzer cone is smaller than the main diaphragm, output dispersion at high frequencies is improved relative to an equivalent single larger diaphragm.

Limited-range drivers, also used alone, are typically found in computers, toys, and clock radios. These drivers are less elaborate and less expensive than wide-range drivers, and they may be severely compromised to fit into very small mounting locations. In these applications, sound quality is a low priority.

A related approach combines multiple identical full-range drivers with active equalization. A well-known example is the Bose 901 loudspeaker, introduced in 1968 by Bose. The 901 uses nine small full-range drivers and no passive crossover network. Overall frequency response is instead established by an external active equalizer. The system architecture is described in Bose patents on loudspeaker equalization, and has been examined in later technical reviews of equalized multi-driver loudspeaker systems, including analyzes of the 901.

=== Subwoofer ===
A subwoofer is a woofer driver used only for the lowest-pitched part of the audio spectrum: typically below 200 Hz for consumer systems, below 100 Hz for professional live sound, and below 80 Hz in THX-approved systems. Because the intended range of frequencies is limited, subwoofer system design is usually simpler in many respects than for conventional loudspeakers, often consisting of a single driver enclosed in a suitable enclosure. Since sound in this frequency range can easily bend around corners by diffraction, the speaker aperture does not have to face the audience, and subwoofers can be mounted in the bottom of the enclosure, facing the floor. This is eased by the limitations of human hearing at low frequencies; Such sounds cannot be located in space due to their large wavelengths compared to higher frequencies, which produce differential effects in the ears due to shadowing by the head and diffraction around it, both of which we rely upon for localization clues.

To accurately reproduce very low bass notes, subwoofer systems must be solidly constructed and properly braced to avoid unwanted sounds from cabinet vibrations. As a result, good subwoofers are typically quite heavy. Many subwoofer systems include integrated power amplifiers and electronic subsonic-filters, with additional controls relevant to low-frequency reproduction (e.g., a crossover knob and a phase switch). These variants are known as active or powered subwoofers. In contrast, passive subwoofers require external amplification.

In typical installations, subwoofers are physically separated from the rest of the speaker cabinets. Because of propagation delay and positioning, their output may be out of phase with the rest of the sound. Consequently, a subwoofer's power amp often has a phase-delay adjustment which may be used to improve performance of the system as a whole. Subwoofers are widely used in large concert and mid-sized venue sound reinforcement systems. Subwoofer cabinets are often built with a bass reflex port, a design feature which, if properly engineered, improves bass performance and increases efficiency.

=== Woofer ===
A woofer is a driver that reproduces low frequencies. The driver works with the characteristics of the speaker enclosure to produce suitable low frequencies. Some loudspeaker systems use a woofer for the lowest frequencies, sometimes well enough that a subwoofer is not needed. Additionally, some loudspeakers use the woofer to handle middle frequencies, eliminating the mid-range driver.

=== Mid-range driver ===
A mid-range speaker is a loudspeaker driver that reproduces a band of frequencies generally between 1–6 kHz, otherwise known as the mid frequencies (between the woofer and tweeter). Mid-range driver diaphragms can be made of paper or composite materials and can be direct radiation drivers (rather like smaller woofers) or they can be compression drivers (rather like some tweeter designs). If the mid-range driver is a direct radiator, it can be mounted on the front baffle of a loudspeaker enclosure, or, if a compression driver, mounted at the throat of a horn for added output level and control of radiation pattern.

=== Tweeter ===
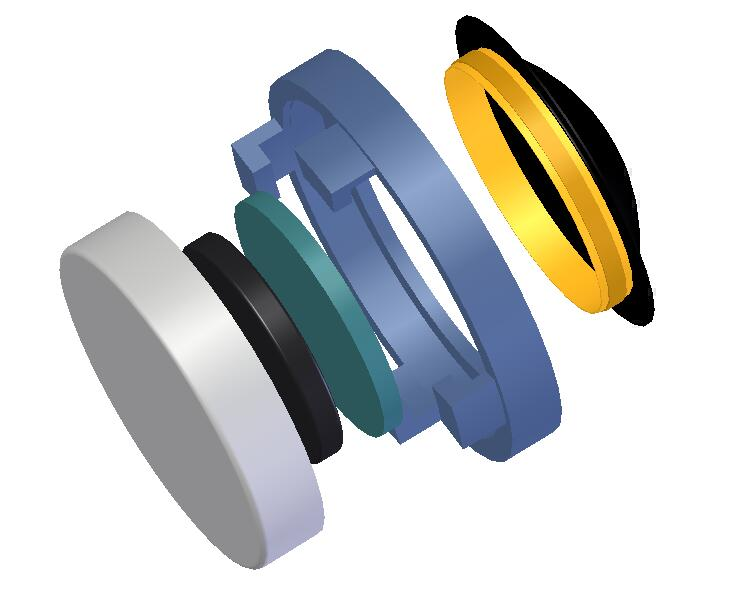
Exploded view of a dome tweeter

A tweeter is a high-frequency driver that reproduces the highest frequencies in a speaker system. A major problem in tweeter design is achieving wide angular sound coverage (off-axis response), since high-frequency sound tends to leave the speaker in narrow beams. Soft-dome tweeters are widely found in home stereo systems, and horn-loaded compression drivers are common in professional sound reinforcement. Ribbon tweeters have gained popularity as the output power of some designs has been increased to levels useful for professional sound reinforcement, and their output pattern is wide in the horizontal plane, a pattern that has convenient applications in concert sound.

=== Coaxial drivers ===
A coaxial driver is a loudspeaker driver with two or more combined concentric drivers. Coaxial drivers have been produced by Altec, Tannoy, Pioneer, KEF, SEAS, B&C Speakers, BMS, Cabasse and Genelec.

== System design ==
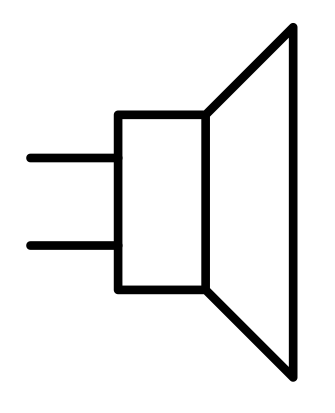
Electronic symbol for a speaker

=== Crossover ===
A passive crossover

A bi-amplified system with an active crossover

Used in multi-driver speaker systems, the crossover is an assembly of filters that separate the input signal into different frequency bands according to the requirements of each driver. Hence, the drivers receive power only in the sound frequency range they were designed for, thereby reducing distortion in the drivers and interference between them. Crossovers can be passive or active.

A passive crossover is an electronic circuit that uses a combination of one or more resistors, inductors and capacitors. These components are combined to form a filter network and are most often placed between the full frequency-range power amplifier and the loudspeaker drivers to divide the amplifier's signal into the necessary frequency bands before being delivered to the individual drivers. Passive crossover circuits need no external power beyond the audio signal itself, but have some disadvantages: they may require larger inductors and capacitors due to power handling requirements. Unlike active crossovers which include a built-in amplifier, passive crossovers have an inherent attenuation within the passband, typically leading to a reduction in damping factor before the voice coil.

An active crossover is an electronic filter circuit that divides the signal into individual frequency bands before power amplification, thus requiring at least one power amplifier for each band. Passive filtering may also be used in this way before power amplification, but it is an uncommon solution, being less flexible than active filtering. Any technique that uses crossover filtering followed by amplification is commonly known as bi-amping, tri-amping, quad-amping, and so on, depending on the minimum number of amplifier channels.

Some loudspeaker designs use a combination of passive and active crossover filtering, such as a passive crossover between the mid- and high-frequency drivers and an active crossover for the low-frequency driver.

Passive crossovers are commonly installed inside speaker boxes and are by far the most common type of crossover for home and low-power use. In car audio systems, passive crossovers may be in a separate box, necessary to accommodate the size of the components used. Passive crossovers may be simple for low-order filtering, or complex to allow steep slopes such as 18 or 24 dB per octave. Passive crossovers can also be designed to compensate for undesired characteristics of driver, horn, or enclosure resonances, and can be tricky to implement, due to component interaction. Passive crossovers, like the driver units that they feed, have power handling limits, have insertion losses, and change the load seen by the amplifier. When high output levels are required, active crossovers may be preferable. Active crossovers may be simple circuits that emulate the response of a passive network or may be more complex, allowing extensive audio adjustments. Some active crossovers, usually digital loudspeaker management systems, may include electronics and controls for precise alignment of phase and time between frequency bands, equalization, dynamic range compression and limiting.

=== Enclosures ===
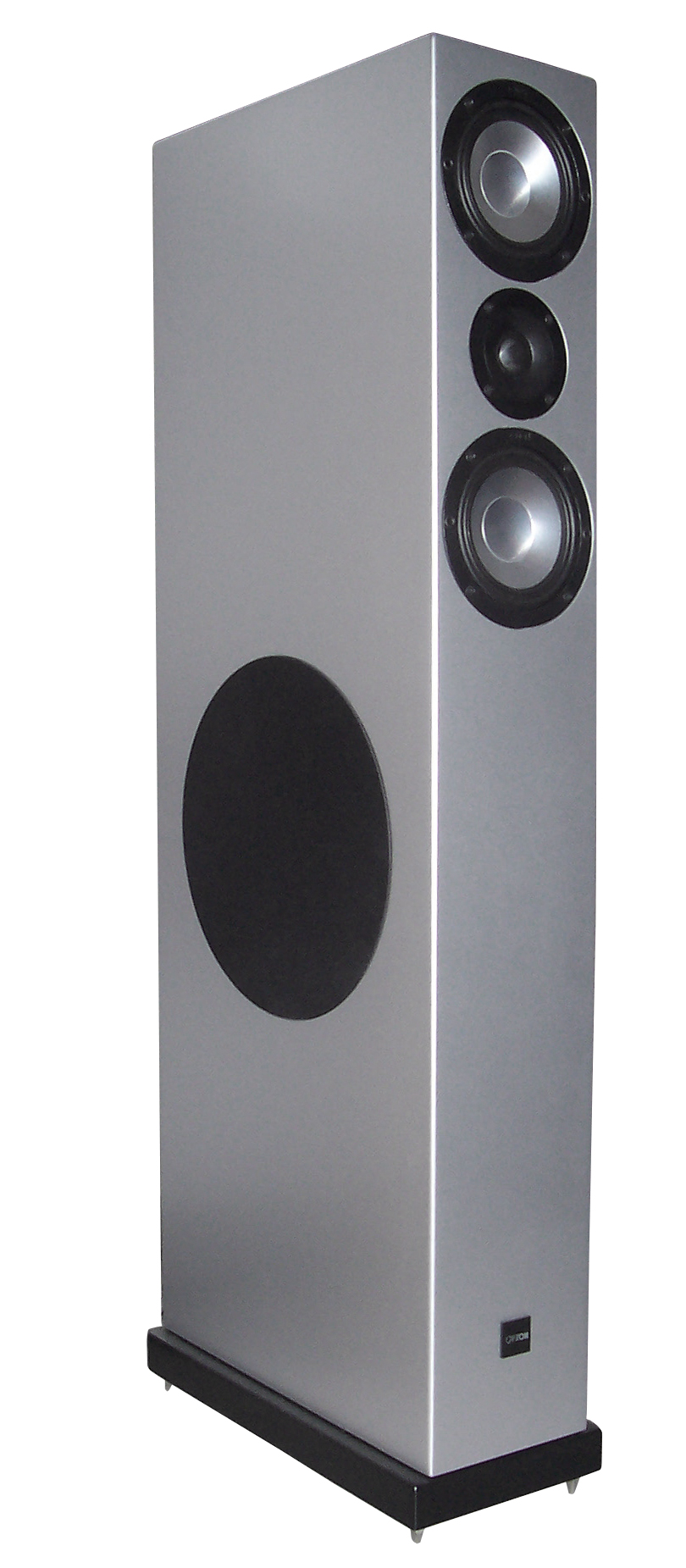
An unusual three-way speaker system. The cabinet is narrow to raise the frequency where a diffraction effect called the baffle step occurs

Most loudspeaker systems consist of drivers mounted in an enclosure, or cabinet. The role of the enclosure is to prevent sound waves emanating from the back of a driver from interfering destructively with those from the front. The sound waves emitted from the back are 180° out of phase with those emitted forward, so without an enclosure they typically cause cancellations which significantly degrade the level and quality of sound at low frequencies.

The simplest driver mount is a flat panel (baffle) with the drivers mounted in holes in it. However, in this approach, sound frequencies with a wavelength longer than the baffle dimensions are canceled out because the antiphase radiation from the rear of the cone interferes with the radiation from the front. With an infinitely large panel, this interference could be entirely prevented. A sufficiently large sealed box can approach this behavior.

Since panels of infinite dimensions are impossible, most enclosures function by containing the rear radiation from the moving diaphragm. A sealed enclosure prevents transmission of the sound emitted from the rear of the loudspeaker by confining the sound in a rigid and airtight box. Techniques used to reduce the transmission of sound through the walls of the cabinet include thicker cabinet walls, internal bracing and lossy wall material.

However, a rigid enclosure reflects sound internally, which can then be transmitted back through the loudspeaker diaphragm—again resulting in degradation of sound quality. This can be reduced by internal absorption using absorptive materials such as glass wool, wool, or synthetic fiber batting, within the enclosure. The internal shape of the enclosure can also be designed to reduce this by reflecting sounds away from the loudspeaker diaphragm, where they may then be absorbed.

Other enclosure types alter the rear sound radiation so it can add constructively to the output from the front of the cone. Designs that do this (including bass reflex, passive radiator, transmission line, etc.) are often used to extend the effective low-frequency response and increase the low-frequency output of the driver.

To make the transition between drivers as seamless as possible, system designers have attempted to time align the drivers by moving one or more driver mounting locations forward or back so that the acoustic center of each driver is in the same vertical plane. This may also involve tilting the driver back, providing a separate enclosure mounting for each driver, or using electronic techniques to achieve the same effect. These attempts have resulted in some unusual cabinet designs.

The speaker mounting scheme (including cabinets) can also cause diffraction, resulting in peaks and dips in the frequency response. The problem is usually greatest at higher frequencies, where wavelengths are similar to, or smaller than, cabinet dimensions.

==== Horn loudspeakers ====
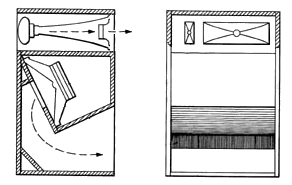
A three-way loudspeaker that uses horns in front of each of the three drivers: a shallow horn for the tweeter, a long, straight horn for mid frequencies and a folded horn for the woofer

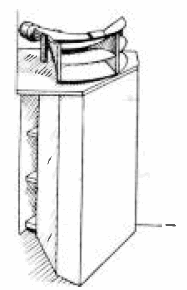
Klipschorn speaker drawing, 1948

Horn loudspeakers are the oldest form of loudspeaker system. The use of horns as voice-amplifying megaphones dates at least to the 17th century, and horns were used in mechanical gramophones as early as 1877. Horn loudspeakers use a shaped waveguide in front of or behind the driver to increase the directivity of the loudspeaker and to transform a small diameter, high-pressure condition at the driver cone surface to a large diameter, low-pressure condition at the mouth of the horn. This improves the acoustic—electro/mechanical impedance match between the driver and ambient air, increasing efficiency, and focusing the sound over a narrower area.

The size of the throat, mouth, the length of the horn, as well as the area expansion rate along it must be carefully chosen to match the driver to properly provide this transforming function over a range of frequencies. (Note: Every horn performs poorly outside its acoustic limits, at both high and low frequencies.) The length and cross-sectional mouth area required to create a bass or sub-bass horn dictate a horn many feet long. Folded horns can reduce the total size, but compel designers to make compromises and accept increased cost and construction complications. Some horn designs not only fold the low-frequency horn but use the walls in a room corner as an extension of the horn mouth. In the late 1940s, horns whose mouths took up much of a room wall were not unknown among hi-fi fans. Room-sized installations became much less acceptable when two or more were required.

A horn-loaded speaker can have a sensitivity as high as 110 dB_{SPL} at 2.83 volts (1 watt at 8 ohms) at 1 meter. This is a hundredfold increase in output compared to a speaker rated at 90 dB sensitivity (given the aforementioned specifications) and is invaluable in applications where high sound levels are required or amplifier power is limited.

An example of a fully horn-loaded loudspeaker system is the Klipschorn, developed in the 1940s by Paul W. Klipsch. Its low-frequency section uses a folded bass horn whose final expansion section is completed by the room corner. The room forms an integral part of the horn rather than merely a placement aid. This increases acoustic loading and efficiency by providing a larger effective horn without enlarging the enclosure, as described in a patent application filed in 1941 and issued in 1943. Klipsch later developed high-frequency horn designs to preserve efficiency and controlled directivity at shorter wavelengths, documented in a patent application filed in 1949 and granted in 1951.

==== Transmission line loudspeaker ====
A transmission line loudspeaker is a loudspeaker enclosure design that uses an acoustic transmission line within the cabinet, compared to the simpler enclosure-based designs. Instead of reverberating in a fairly simple damped enclosure, sound from the back of the bass speaker is directed into a long (generally folded) damped pathway within the speaker enclosure, which allows greater control and efficient use of speaker energy.

=== Wiring connections ===
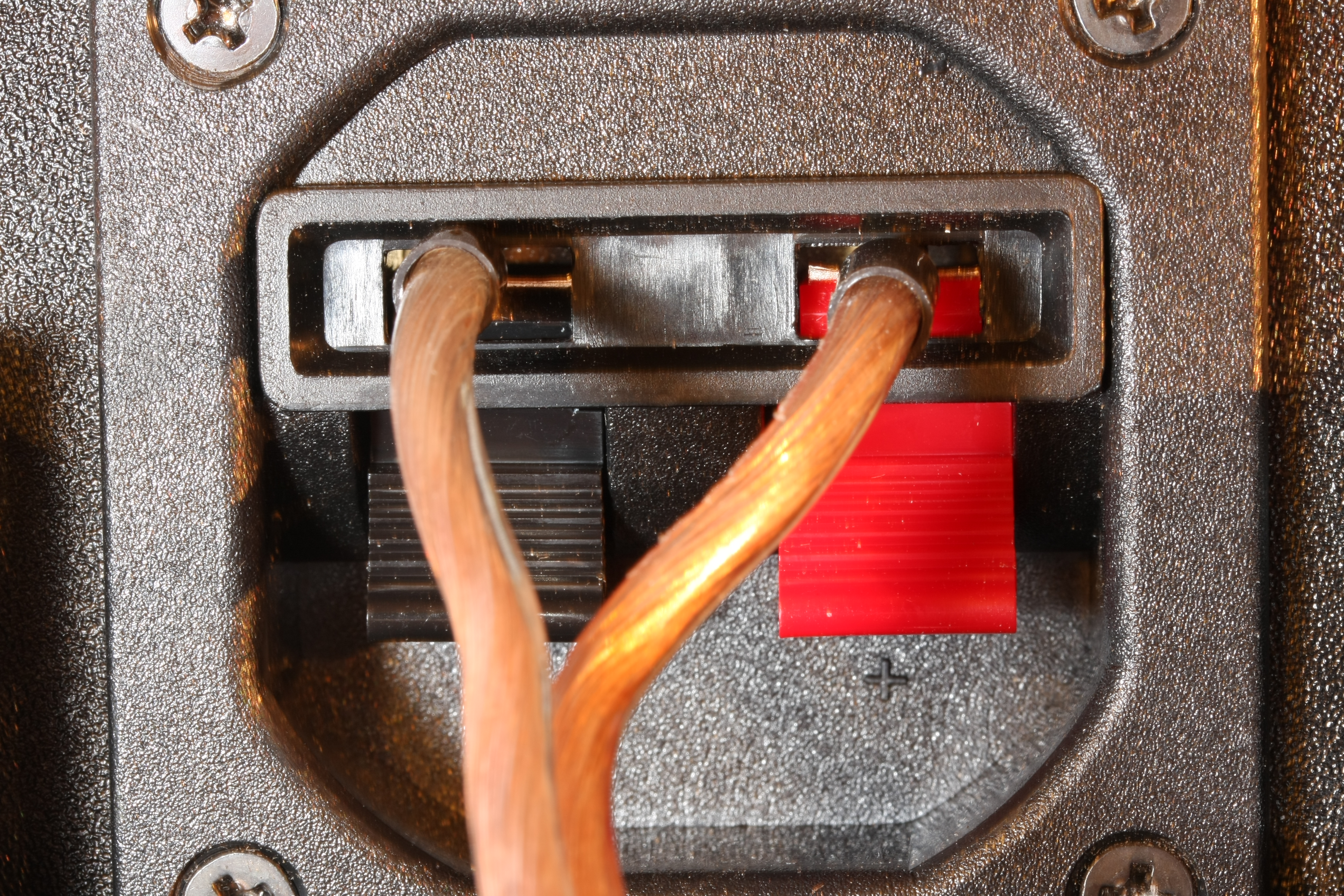
Grip connectors on a loudspeaker to connect it to a speaker terminal

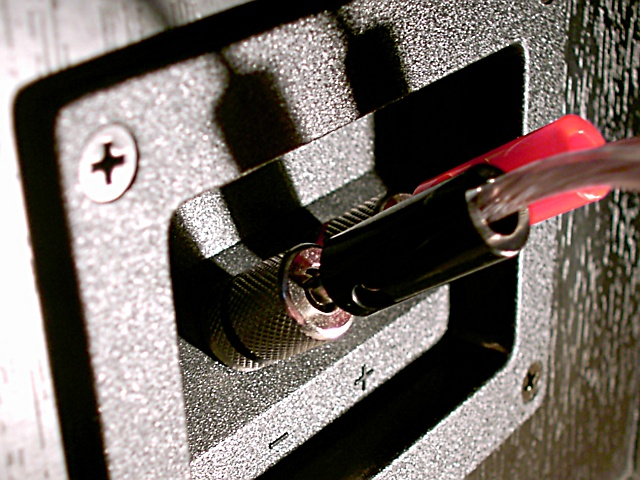
Two-way binding posts on a loudspeaker, connected using banana plugs

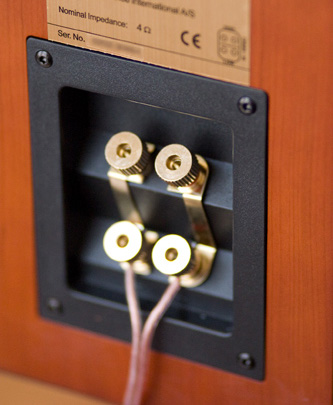
A 4-ohm loudspeaker with two pairs of binding posts capable of accepting bi-wiring after the removal of two metal straps

Most home hi-fi loudspeakers use two wiring points to connect to the source of the signal (for example, to the audio amplifier or receiver). To accept the wire connection, the loudspeaker enclosure may have binding posts, spring clips, or a panel-mount jack. If the wires for a pair of speakers are not connected with respect to the proper electrical polarity, (Note: The + and − connections on the speaker and amplifier should be connected + to + and − to −; speaker cable is almost always marked so that one conductor of a pair can be distinguished from the other, even if it has run under or behind things in its run from amplifier to speaker location.) the loudspeakers are said to be out of phase or more properly out of polarity. Given identical signals, motion in the cone of an out of polarity loudspeaker is in the opposite direction of the others. This typically causes monophonic material in a stereo recording to be canceled out, reduced in level, and made more difficult to localize, all due to destructive interference of the sound waves. The cancellation effect is most noticeable at frequencies where the loudspeakers are separated by a quarter wavelength or less; low frequencies are affected the most. This type of miswiring error does not damage speakers, but is not optimal for listening.

With sound reinforcement system, PA system and instrument amplifier speaker enclosures, cables and some type of jack or connector are typically used. Lower- and mid-priced sound system and instrument speaker cabinets often use 1/4-inch jacks. Higher-priced and higher-powered sound system cabinets and instrument speaker cabinets often use Speakon connectors.

=== Wireless speakers ===
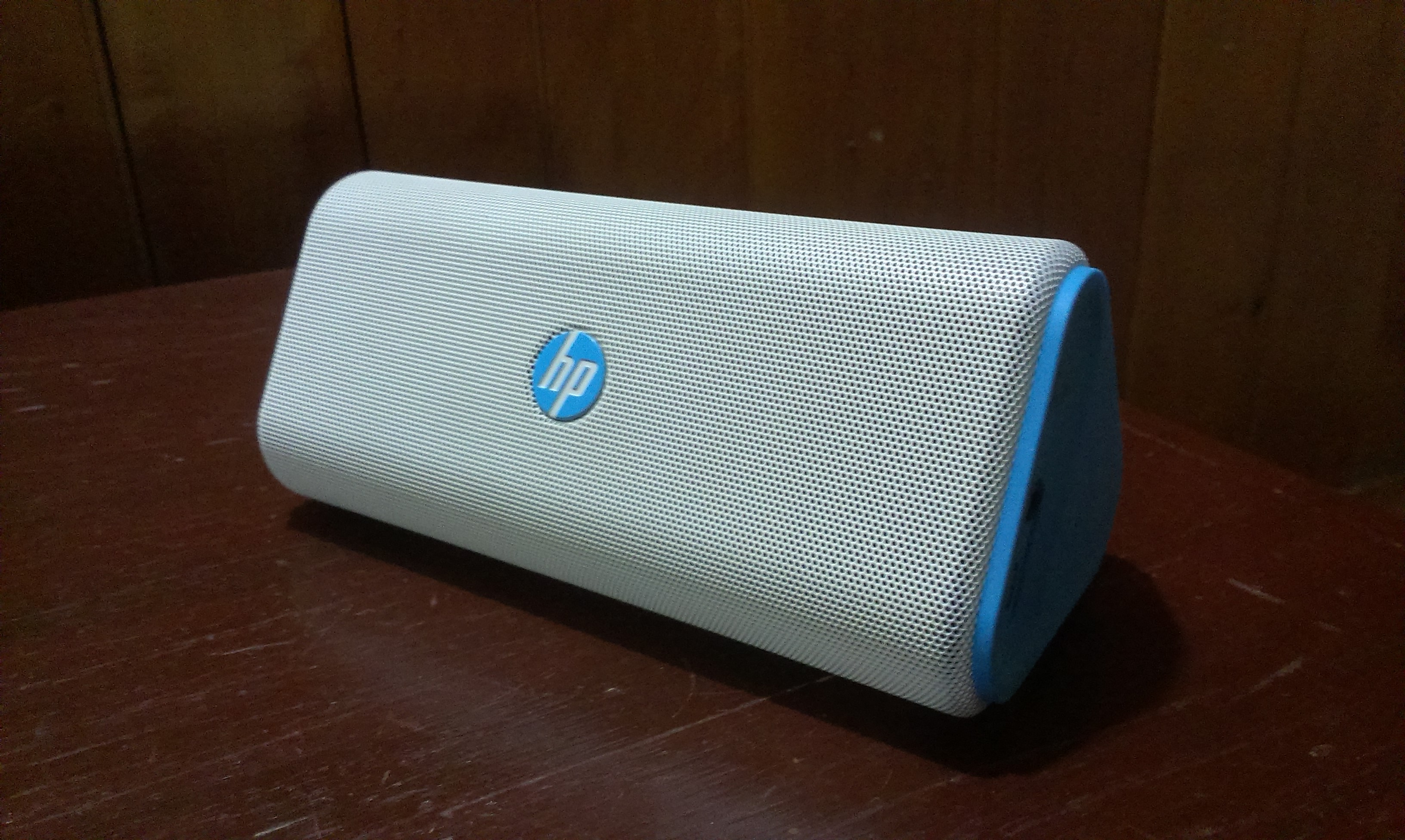
HP Roar Wireless Speaker

Wireless speakers are similar to wired powered speakers, but they receive audio signals using radio frequency (RF) waves rather than over audio cables. There is an amplifier integrated in the speaker's cabinet because the RF waves alone are not enough to drive the speaker. Wireless speakers still need power, so require a nearby AC power outlet or onboard batteries. Only the wire for the audio is eliminated.

== Specifications ==
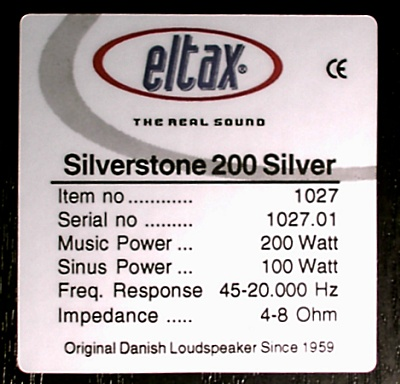
Specifications label on a loudspeaker

Speaker specifications generally include:

- Speaker or driver type (individual units only) – full-range, woofer, tweeter, or mid-range.
- Size of individual drivers. For cone drivers, the quoted size is generally the outside diameter of the basket. However, it may less commonly also be the diameter of the cone surround, measured apex to apex, or the distance from the center of one mounting hole to its opposite. Voice-coil diameter may also be specified. If the loudspeaker has a compression horn driver, the diameter of the horn throat may be given.
- Rated power – power, and peak power a loudspeaker can handle. A driver may be damaged at much less than its rated power if driven past its mechanical limits at lower frequencies. In some jurisdictions, power handling has a legal meaning allowing comparisons between loudspeakers under consideration. Elsewhere, the variety of meanings for power handling capacity can be quite confusing.
- Impedance – typically 4 Ω (ohms), 8 Ω, etc.
- Baffle or enclosure type (enclosed systems only) – Sealed, bass reflex, etc.
- Number of drivers (complete speaker systems only) – two-way, three-way, etc.
- Class of loudspeaker:
  - Class 1: maximum SPL 110–119 dB, the type of loudspeaker used for reproducing a person speaking in a small space or for background music; mainly used as fill speakers for Class 2 or Class 3 speakers; typically small 4 or 5-inch woofers and dome tweeters
  - Class 2: maximum SPL 120–129 dB, the type of medium-power–capable loudspeaker used for reinforcement in small to medium spaces or as fill speakers for Class 3 or Class 4 speakers; typically 5 to 8-inch woofers and dome tweeters
  - Class 3: maximum SPL 130–139 dB, high-power–capable loudspeakers used in main systems in small to medium spaces; also used as fill speakers for class 4 speakers; typically 6.5 to 12-inch woofers and 2 or 3-inch compression drivers for high frequencies
  - Class 4: maximum SPL 140 dB and higher, very-high-power–capable loudspeakers used as mains in medium to large spaces (or for fill speakers for these medium to large spaces); 10 to 15-inch woofers and 3-inch compression drivers

and optionally:

- Crossover frequency(ies) (multi-driver systems only) – The nominal frequency boundaries of the division between drivers.
- Frequency response – The measured, or specified, output over a specified range of frequencies for a constant input level varied across those frequencies. It sometimes includes a variance limit, such as within "± 2.5 dB."
- Thiele/Small parameters (individual drivers only) – these include the driver's F_{s} (resonance frequency), Q_{ts} (a driver's Q; more or less, its damping factor at resonant frequency), V_{as} (the equivalent air compliance volume of the driver), etc.
- Sensitivity – The sound pressure level produced by a loudspeaker in a non-reverberant environment, often specified in _{SPL} measured at 1 meter with an input of 1 watt (2.83 volts RMS into 8 Ω), typically at one or more specified frequencies. Manufacturers often use this rating in marketing material.
- Maximum sound pressure level – The highest output the loudspeaker can manage, short of damage or not exceeding a particular distortion level. Manufacturers often use this rating in marketing material—commonly without reference to frequency range or distortion level.

=== Electrical characteristics of dynamic loudspeakers ===
To make sound, a loudspeaker is driven by modulated electric current (produced by an amplifier) that passes through a speaker coil which then (through inductance) creates a magnetic field around the coil. The electric current variations that pass through the speaker are thus converted to a varying magnetic field, whose interaction with the driver's magnetic field moves the speaker diaphragm, which thus forces the driver to produce air motion that is similar to the original signal from the amplifier.

The load that a driver presents to an amplifier consists of a complex electrical impedance—a combination of resistance and both capacitive and inductive reactance, which combines properties of the driver, its mechanical motion, the effects of crossover components (if any are in the signal path between amplifier and driver), and the effects of air loading on the driver as modified by the enclosure and its environment. Most amplifiers' output specifications are given at a specific power into an ideal resistive load; however, a loudspeaker does not have a constant impedance across its frequency range. Instead, the voice coil is inductive, the driver has mechanical resonances, the enclosure changes the driver's electrical and mechanical characteristics, and a passive crossover between the drivers and the amplifier contributes its own variations. The result is a load impedance that varies widely with frequency, and usually a varying phase relationship between voltage and current as well, also changing with frequency. Some amplifiers can cope with the variation better than others can.

Electrical models of loudspeakers are available that address these effects in detail.

=== Electromechanical measurements ===
Examples of typical loudspeaker measurement are: amplitude and phase characteristics vs. frequency; impulse response under one or more conditions (e.g. square waves, sine wave bursts, etc.); directivity vs. frequency (e.g. horizontally, vertically, spherically, etc.); harmonic and intermodulation distortion vs. sound pressure level (SPL) output, using any of several test signals; stored energy (i.e. ringing) at various frequencies; impedance vs. frequency; and small-signal vs. large-signal performance. Most of these measurements require sophisticated and often expensive equipment to perform. The sound pressure level (SPL) a loudspeaker produces is commonly expressed as decibels relative to 20 μPa (dB_{SPL}).

=== Efficiency vs. sensitivity ===
Loudspeaker efficiency is defined as the sound power output divided by the electrical power input. Most loudspeakers are inefficient transducers; only about 1% of the electrical energy sent by an amplifier to a typical home loudspeaker is converted to acoustic energy. The remainder is converted to heat, mostly in the voice coil and magnet assembly. The main reason for this is the difficulty of achieving proper impedance matching between the acoustic impedance of the drive unit and the air it radiates into. (Note: At low frequencies, improving this match is the main purpose of speaker enclosure designs.) The efficiency of loudspeaker drivers varies with frequency as well. For instance, the output of a woofer driver decreases as the input frequency decreases because of the increasingly poor impedance match between air and the driver.

Driver ratings based on the SPL for a given input are called sensitivity ratings and are notionally similar to efficiency. Sensitivity is usually expressed as the SPL (dB_{SPL} by common usage meaning dB relative to 20 μPa) at 1 W electrical input, measured at 1 meter, (Note: A different measurement technique is used for headphones.) often at a single frequency. The voltage used is often 2.83 V_{RMS}, which results in 1 watt into a nominal 8 Ω speaker impedance. Measurements taken with this reference are typically quoted as dB_{SPL} with 2.83 V @ 1 m.

The sound pressure output is measured at (or mathematically scaled to be equivalent to a measurement taken at) one meter from the loudspeaker and on-axis (directly in front of it), under the condition that the loudspeaker is radiating into an infinitely large space and mounted on an infinite baffle. Clearly then, sensitivity does not correlate precisely with efficiency, as it also depends on the directivity of the driver being tested and the acoustic environment in front of the actual loudspeaker. For example, a cheerleader's horn produces more sound output in the direction it is pointed by concentrating sound waves from the cheerleader in one direction, thus focusing them. The horn also improves impedance matching between the voice and the air, which produces more acoustic power for a given speaker power.

Since sensitivity and power handling are largely independent properties, a driver with a higher maximum power rating cannot necessarily be driven to louder levels than a lower-rated one. In the example that follows, assume (for simplicity) that the drivers being compared have the same electrical impedance, are operated at the same frequency within both driver's respective passbands, and that power compression and distortion are insignificant. A speaker 3 dB more sensitive than another produces very nearly double the sound power (is 3 dB louder) for the same electrical power input. Thus, a 100 W driver (A) rated at 92 dB_{SPL} for 1 W @ 1 m sensitivity puts out twice as much acoustic power as a 200 W driver (B) rated at 89 dB_{SPL} for 1 W @ 1 m when both are driven with 100 W of electrical power. In this example, when driven at 100 W, speaker A produces the same SPL, or loudness as speaker B would produce with 200 W input. Thus, a 3 dB increase in the sensitivity of the speaker means that it needs half the amplifier power to achieve a given SPL. This translates into a smaller, less complex power amplifier—and often, to reduced overall system cost.

It is typically not possible to combine high efficiency (especially at low frequencies) with compact enclosure size and adequate low-frequency response. One can, for the most part, choose only two of the three parameters when designing a speaker system. So, for example, if extended low-frequency performance and small box size are important, one must accept low efficiency. This rule of thumb is sometimes called Hofmann's Iron Law (after J.A. Hofmann, the H in KLH).

== Listening environment ==
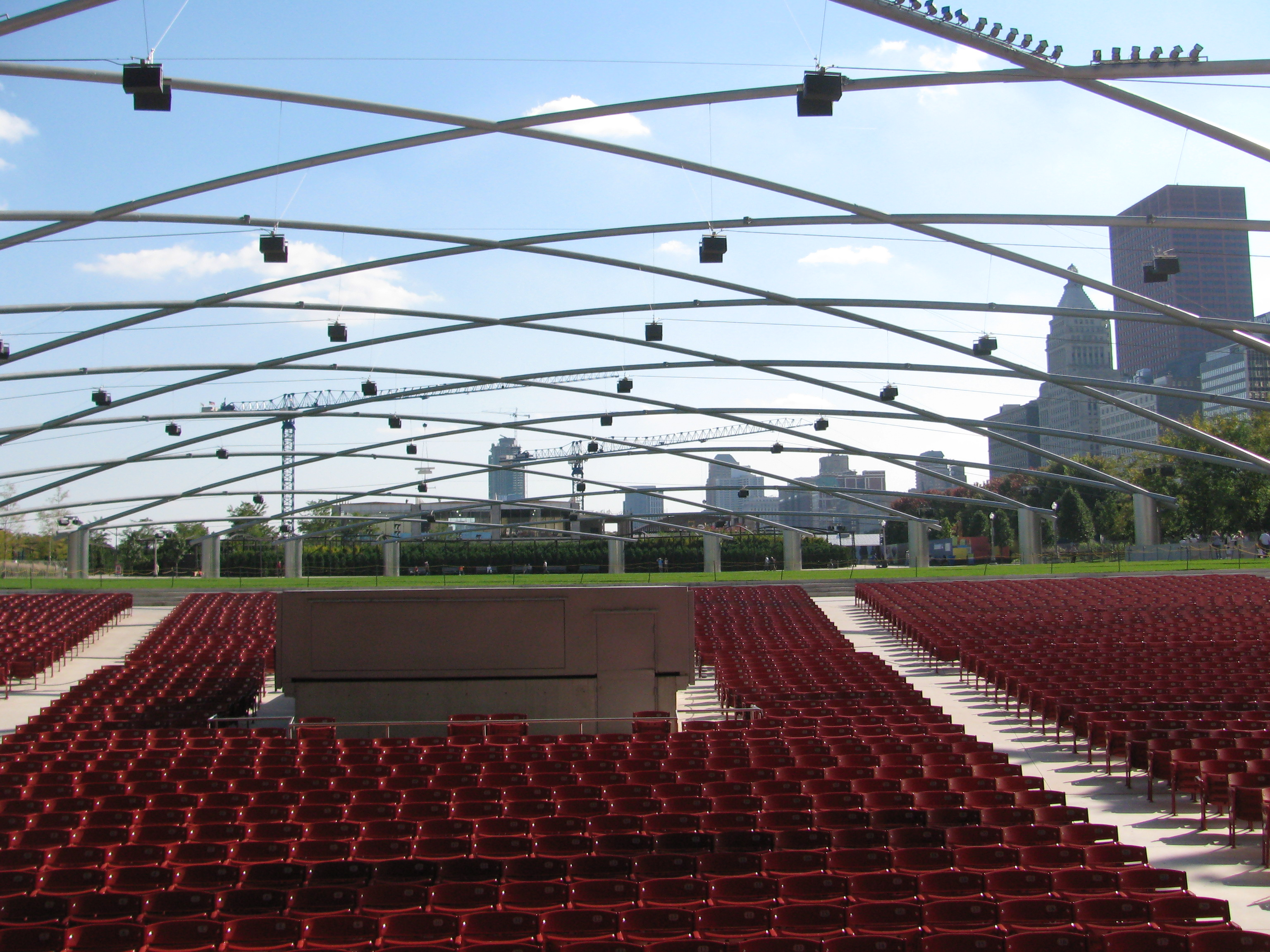
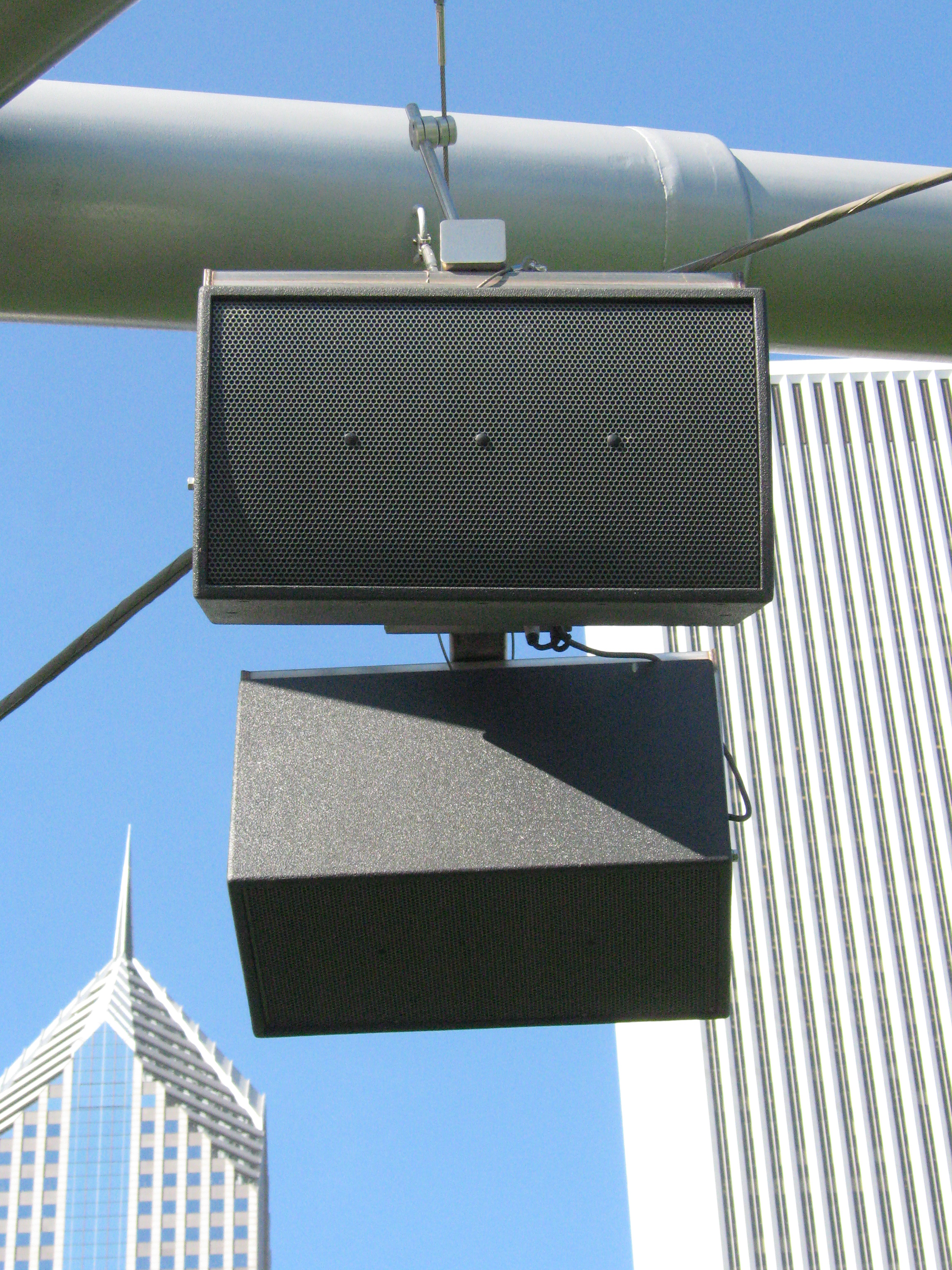
At Jay Pritzker Pavilion, a LARES system is combined with a zoned sound reinforcement system, both suspended on an overhead steel trellis, to synthesize an indoor acoustic environment outdoors.

The interaction of a loudspeaker system with its environment is complex and is largely out of the loudspeaker designer's control. Most listening rooms present a more or less reflective environment, depending on size, shape, volume, and furnishings. This means the sound reaching a listener's ears consists not only of sound directly from the speaker system, but also the same sound delayed by traveling to and from (and being modified by) one or more surfaces. These reflected sound waves, when added to the direct sound, cause cancellation and addition at assorted frequencies (e.g., from resonant room modes), thus changing the timbre and character of the sound at the listener's ears. The human brain is sensitive to small variations in reflected sound, and this is part of the reason why a loudspeaker system sounds different at different listening positions or in different rooms.

A significant factor in the sound of a loudspeaker system is the amount of absorption and diffusion present in the environment. Clapping one's hands in a typical empty room, without draperies or carpet, produces a zippy, fluttery echo due to a lack of absorption and diffusion.

=== Placement ===
In a typical rectangular listening room, the hard, parallel surfaces of the walls, floor and ceiling cause primary acoustic resonance nodes in each of the three dimensions: left–right, up–down and forward–backward. Furthermore, there are more complex resonance modes involving up to all six boundary surfaces combining to create standing waves. This is called speaker boundary interference response (SBIR). Low frequencies excite these modes the most, since long wavelengths are not much affected by furniture compositions or placement. The mode spacing is critical, especially in small and medium-sized rooms like recording studios, home theaters and broadcast studios. The proximity of the loudspeakers to room boundaries affects how strongly the resonances are excited as well as affecting the relative strength at each frequency. The location of the listener is critical, too, as a position near a boundary can have a great effect on the perceived balance of frequencies. This is because standing-wave patterns are most easily heard in these locations and at lower frequencies, below the Schroeder frequency, depending on room size.

=== Directivity ===
Acousticians, in studying the radiation of sound sources have developed some concepts important to understanding how loudspeakers are perceived. The simplest possible radiating source is a point source. An ideal point source is an infinitesimally small point radiating sound. It may be easier to imagine a tiny pulsating sphere, uniformly increasing and decreasing in diameter, sending out sound waves in all directions equally.

Any object radiating sound, including a loudspeaker system, can be thought of as being composed of combinations of such simple point sources. The radiation pattern of a combination of point sources is not the same as for a single source but depends on the distance and orientation between the sources, the position relative to them from which the listener hears the combination, and the frequency of the sound involved. Using mathematics, some simple combinations of sources are easily solved.

One simple combination is two simple sources separated by a distance and vibrating out of phase, one miniature sphere expanding while the other is contracting. The pair is known as a dipole, and the radiation of this combination is similar to that of a very small dynamic loudspeaker operating without a baffle. The directivity of a dipole is a figure-8 shape with maximum output along a vector that connects the two sources and minimum output to the sides when the observing point is equidistant from the two sources – the sum of the positive and negative waves cancel each other. While most drivers are dipoles, depending on the enclosure to which they are attached, they may radiate as point sources or dipoles. If mounted on a finite baffle, and these out-of-phase waves are allowed to interact, peaks and nulls in the frequency response result. When the rear radiation is absorbed or trapped in a box, the diaphragm becomes an approximate point-source radiator. Bipolar speakers, made by mounting in-phase drivers (both moving out of or into the box in unison) on opposite sides of a box, are a method of approaching omnidirectional radiation patterns.

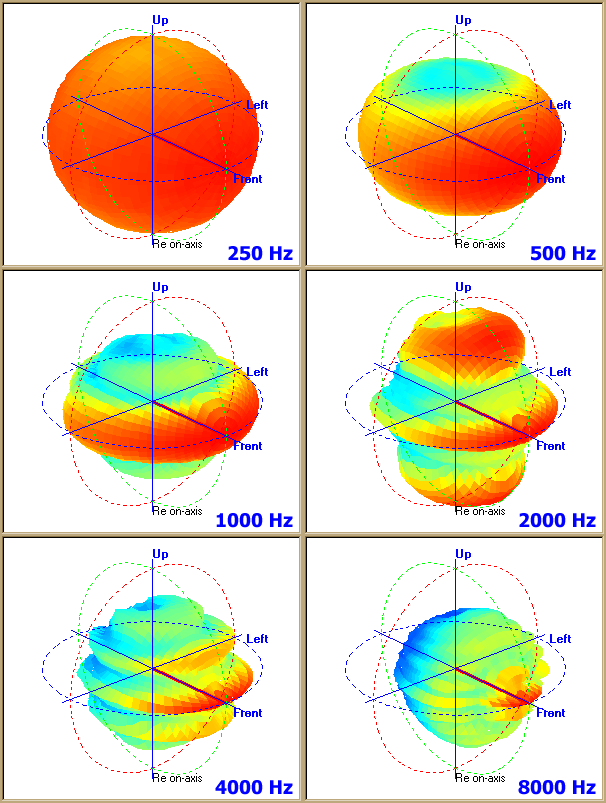
Polar plots of a four-driver industrial columnar public address loudspeaker taken at six frequencies. Note how the pattern is nearly omnidirectional at low frequencies, converging to a wide fan-shaped pattern at 1 kHz, then separating into lobes and getting weaker at higher frequencies

In real life, individual drivers are complex 3D shapes such as cones and domes, and they are placed on a baffle for various reasons. Deriving a mathematical expression for the directivity of a complex shape, based on modeling combinations of point sources, is usually not possible, but in the far field, the directivity of a loudspeaker with a circular diaphragm is close to that of a flat circular piston, so it can be used as an illustrative simplification for discussion.

Far-field directivity of a flat circular piston in an infinite baffle is

$$p(\theta) = \frac{p_0 J_1(k_a \sin \theta)}{k_a \sin \theta}$$

where $k_a=\frac{2\pi a}{\lambda}$, $p_0$ is the pressure on axis, $a$ is the piston radius, $\lambda$ is the wavelength (i.e. $\lambda = \frac{c}{f} = \frac{\text{speed of sound}}{\text{frequency}}$), $\theta$ is the angle off axis and $J_1$ is the Bessel function of the first kind.

A planar source such as this radiates sound uniformly for wavelengths longer than the dimensions of the planar source, and as frequency increases, the sound from such a source focuses into an increasingly narrower angle. The smaller the driver, the higher the frequency where this narrowing of directivity occurs. Even if the diaphragm is not perfectly circular, this effect occurs such that larger sources are more directive. Several loudspeaker designs approximate this behavior. Most are electrostatic or planar magnetic designs.

Various manufacturers use different driver mounting arrangements to create a specific type of sound field in the space for which they are designed. The resulting radiation patterns may be intended to more closely simulate the way sound is produced by real instruments, or simply create a controlled energy distribution from the input signal. An example of the first is a room corner system with many small drivers on the surface of a 1/8 sphere. A system design of this type was patented and produced commercially as the Bose 2201.

Directivity is an important issue because it affects the frequency balance of sound a listener hears, and also the interaction of the speaker system with the room and its contents. A very directive (sometimes termed beamy) speaker (i.e. on an axis perpendicular to the speaker face) may result in a reverberant field lacking in high frequencies, giving the impression the speaker is deficient in treble, even though on-axis measurements indicate sufficient treble. This is part of the reason why on-axis frequency response measurement is not a complete characterization of the sound of a given loudspeaker.

== Other speaker designs ==
While dynamic cone speakers remain the most popular choice, many other speaker technologies exist.

=== With a diaphragm ===
==== Moving-iron loudspeakers ====
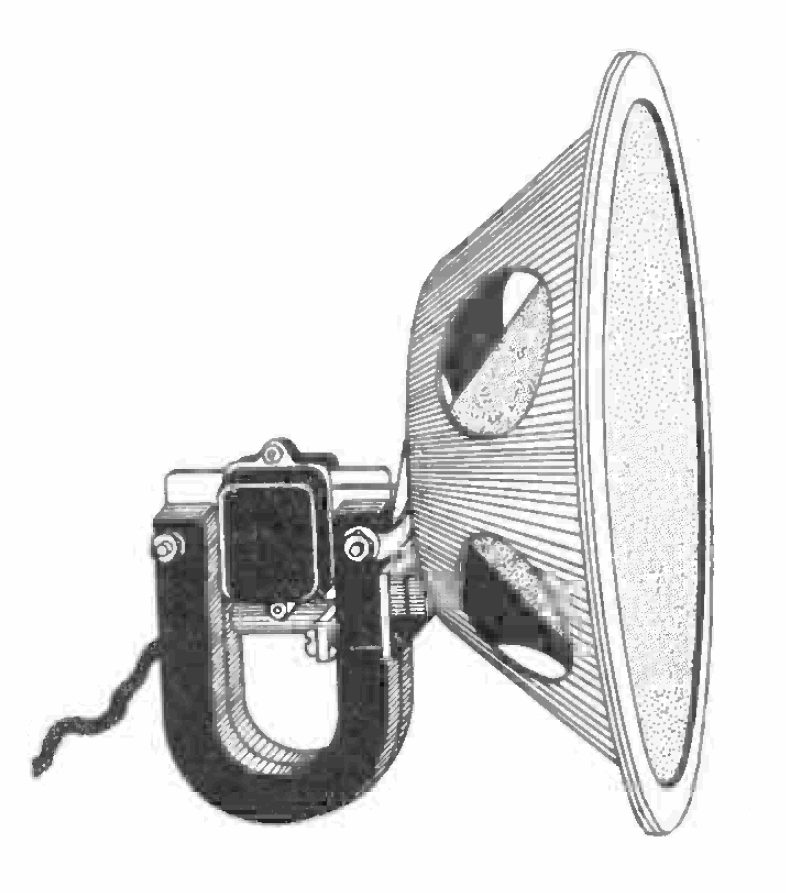
Moving iron speaker

Unlike the newer dynamic (moving coil) design, a moving-iron speaker uses a stationary coil to vibrate a magnetized piece of metal (called the iron, reed, or armature). The metal is either attached to the diaphragm or is the diaphragm itself. The original loudspeaker design used moving iron. This design originally appeared in the early telephone.

Moving iron drivers are inefficient and have limited frequency response. They require large magnets and coils to increase sound output.

Balanced armature drivers (a type of moving iron driver) use an armature that moves like a see-saw or diving board. Since they are not damped, they are highly efficient, but they also produce strong resonances. They are still used today for high-end earphones and hearing aids, where small size and high efficiency are important.

==== Piezoelectric speakers ====
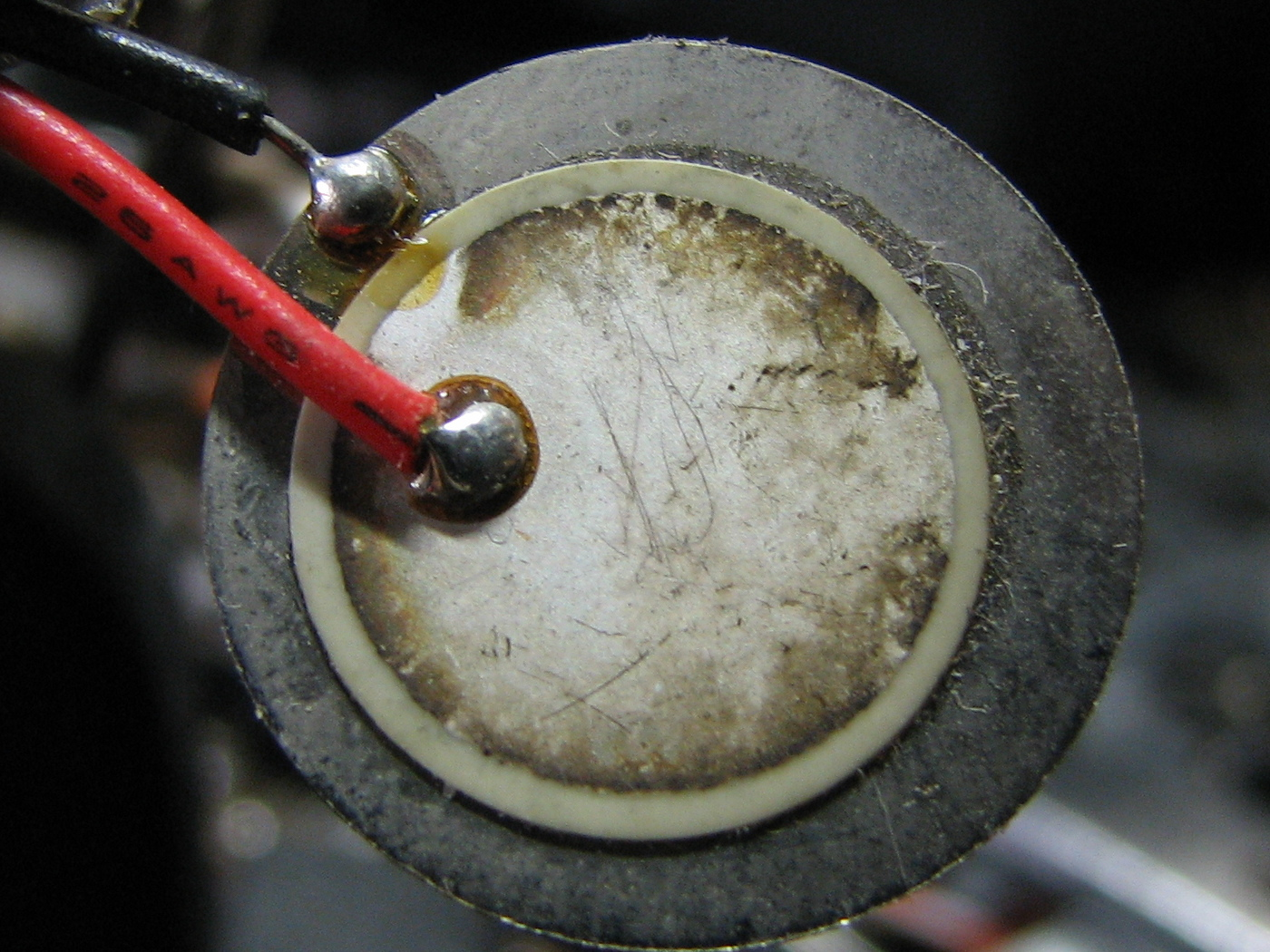
A piezoelectric buzzer. The white ceramic piezoelectric material can be seen fixed to a metal diaphragm.

Piezoelectric speakers are frequently used as beepers in watches and other electronic devices, and are sometimes used as tweeters in less-expensive speaker systems, such as computer speakers and portable radios. Piezoelectric speakers have several advantages over conventional loudspeakers: They are resistant to overloads that can destroy other high-frequency drivers, and, due to their electrical properties, they can be used without a crossover. Piezoelectric speakers can have extended high-frequency output, and this is useful in some specialized circumstances; for instance, sonar applications in which piezoelectric variants are used as both output devices (generating underwater sound) and as input devices (acting as the sensing components of underwater microphones). They have other advantages in these applications, not the least of which is simple and solid-state construction that resists seawater better than a ribbon or cone-based device would. There are also disadvantages: some amplifiers may oscillate when driving capacitive loads like piezoelectrics, which results in distortion or damage to the amplifier. Additionally, their frequency response is typically inferior to that of other technologies.

In 2013, Kyocera introduced piezoelectric ultra-thin medium-size film speakers with only one millimeter of thickness and seven grams of weight for their 55-inch OLED televisions.

==== Magnetostatic loudspeakers ====
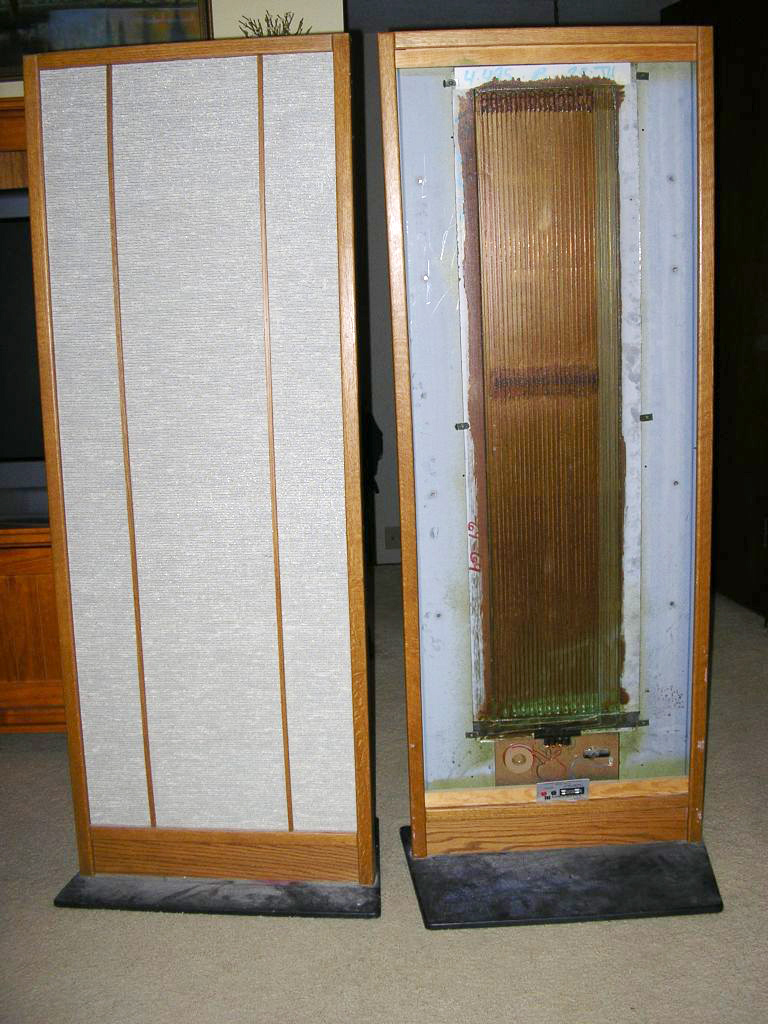
Magnetostatic loudspeaker

Instead of a voice coil driving a speaker cone, a magnetostatic speaker uses an array of metal strips bonded to a large film membrane. The magnetic field produced by signal current flowing through the strips interacts with the field of permanent bar magnets mounted behind them. The force produced moves the membrane and so the air in front of it. Typically, these designs are less efficient than conventional moving-coil speakers.

==== Magnetostrictive speakers ====
Transducers based on magnetostriction have been predominantly used as ultrasonic sound wave radiators for sonar, but their use has also spread to audio speaker systems, including subwoofers. Magnetostrictive speaker drivers have some special advantages: they can provide greater force (with smaller excursions) than other technologies and low excursion can avoid distortions from large excursion as in other designs; the magnetizing coil is stationary and therefore more easily cooled; they are robust because delicate suspensions and voice coils are not required. Magnetostrictive speaker modules have been produced by Fostex and FeONIC.

==== Electrostatic loudspeakers ====
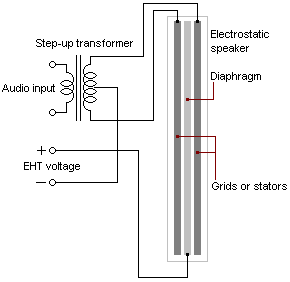
Schematic showing an electrostatic speaker's construction and its connections. The thickness of the diaphragm and grids has been exaggerated for the purpose of illustration.

Electrostatic loudspeakers use a high-voltage electric field (rather than a magnetic field) between two conductive planes to drive a thin statically charged membrane between them. Because the driving force is applied over the entire membrane surface rather than from a small voice coil, they potentially provide a more linear and lower-distortion motion than dynamic drivers. They also have a relatively narrow dispersion pattern that can make for precise sound-field positioning comparable to studio monitors. However, their optimum listening area is small and they are not very efficient speakers. Diaphragm excursion is severely limited due to practical construction limitations—the further apart the planes are positioned, the higher the voltage must be to achieve acceptable output. This increases the tendency for electrical arcs, as well as increasing the speaker's tendency to attract dust particles. Arcing remains a potential problem with current technologies, especially when the panels are allowed to collect dust or dirt and are driven with high signal levels.

Electrostatics are inherently dipole radiators and, due to the thin flexible membrane, are less suited for use in enclosures, which can reduce low-frequency front-to-back cancellations. Due to this and the low excursion capability, full-range electrostatic loudspeakers are large by nature, and the bass rolls off at a frequency corresponding to a quarter wavelength of the narrowest panel dimension. To reduce the size of commercial products, they are sometimes used as a high-frequency driver in combination with a conventional dynamic driver that handles the bass frequencies effectively.

Electrostatics are usually driven through a step-up transformer that multiplies the voltage swings produced by the power amplifier. This transformer also multiplies the capacitive load that is inherent in electrostatic transducers, which means the effective impedance presented to the power amplifiers varies widely by frequency. A speaker that is nominally 8 ohms may actually present a load of 1 ohm at higher frequencies, which is challenging for some amplifier designs.

==== Ribbon and planar magnetic loudspeakers ====
A ribbon speaker consists of a thin metal-film ribbon suspended in a magnetic field. The electrical signal is applied to the ribbon, which moves in the magnetic field to create the sound. The advantage of a ribbon driver is that the ribbon has very little mass; thus, it can accelerate very quickly, yielding a very good high-frequency response. Ribbon loudspeakers are often very fragile. Most ribbon tweeters emit sound in a dipole pattern. A few have backings that limit the dipole radiation pattern. Above and below the ends of the more or less rectangular ribbon, there is less audible output due to phase cancellation, but the precise amount of directivity depends on the ribbon length. Ribbon designs generally require exceptionally powerful magnets, which makes them costly to manufacture. Ribbons have a very low impedance that most amplifiers cannot drive directly. As a result, a step-down transformer is typically used to increase the current through the ribbon. The amplifier sees a load that is the ribbon's resistance times the transformer turns ratio squared. The transformer must be carefully designed so that its frequency response and parasitic losses do not degrade the sound, further increasing cost and complication relative to conventional designs.

Planar magnetic speakers consist of a flexible membrane with a voice coil printed or mounted on it. The current flowing through the coil interacts with the magnetic field of carefully placed magnets on either side of the diaphragm, causing the membrane to vibrate more or less uniformly and without much bending or wrinkling. The driving force covers a large percentage of the membrane surface and reduces resonance problems inherent in coil-driven flat diaphragms.

==== Bending wave loudspeakers ====
Bending wave transducers use a diaphragm that is intentionally flexible. The rigidity of the material increases from the center to the outside. Short wavelengths radiate primarily from the inner area, while longer waves reach the edge of the speaker. To prevent reflections from the outside back into the center, long waves are absorbed by a surrounding damper. Such transducers can cover a wide frequency range and have been promoted as being close to an ideal point sound source. This uncommon approach is being taken by only a very few manufacturers, in very different arrangements.

The Ohm Walsh loudspeakers use a unique driver designed by Lincoln Walsh, who had been a radar development engineer in WWII. He became interested in audio equipment design and his last project was a unique, one-way speaker using a single driver. The cone faced down into a sealed, airtight enclosure. Rather than move back and forth as conventional speakers do, the cone rippled and created sound in a manner known in RF electronics as a transmission line. (Note: Not to be confused with a transmission line loudspeaker where air serves as the transmission medium, not the cone.) The new speaker created a cylindrical sound field. Lincoln Walsh died before his speaker was released to the public. The Ohm Acoustics firm has produced several loudspeaker models using the Walsh driver design since then. German Physiks, an audio equipment firm in Germany, also produces speakers using this approach.

Josef W. Manger and his German firm Manger, designed and produced a bending wave driver that appears conventional but bends in a carefully controlled way to produce full-range sound.

==== Flat panel loudspeakers ====
There have been many attempts to reduce the size of speaker systems, or alternatively to make them less obvious. One such attempt was the development of exciter transducer coils mounted to flat panels to act as sound sources. These can then be made in a neutral color and hung on walls where they are less noticeable than many speakers. There are two related problems with flat panel techniques: first, a flat panel is necessarily more flexible than a cone shape in the same material, and therefore moves as a single unit even less, and second, resonances in the panel are difficult to control, leading to considerable distortions. There have been several flat-panel systems commercially produced in recent years.

==== Heil air motion transducers ====
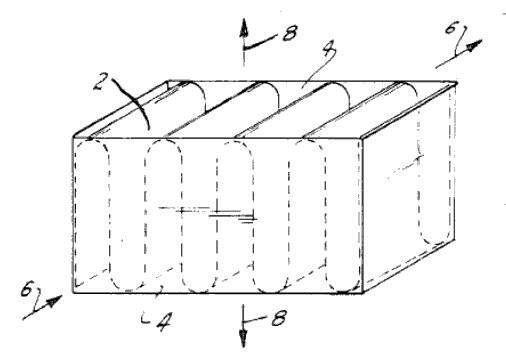
In Heil's air motion transducer, current through the membrane (2) causes it to move left and right in magnetic field (6), moving air in and out along directions (8); barriers (4) prevent air from moving in unintended directions.

Oskar Heil invented the air motion transducer in the 1960s. In this approach, a pleated diaphragm is mounted in a magnetic field and forced to close and open under control of a music signal. Air is forced from between the pleats in accordance with the imposed signal, generating sound. The drivers are less fragile than ribbons and considerably more efficient and able to produce higher absolute output levels than ribbon, electrostatic, or planar magnetic tweeter designs. ESS, a California manufacturer, licensed the design, employed Heil, and produced a range of speaker systems using his tweeters during the 1970s and 1980s. Lafayette Radio, a large US retail store chain, also sold speaker systems using such tweeters for a time. There are several manufacturers of these drivers. Martin Logan produces several AMT speakers in the US and GoldenEar Technologies incorporates them in its entire speaker line.

==== Transparent ionic conduction speaker ====
In 2013, a research team introduced a transparent ionic conduction speaker that has two sheets of transparent conductive gel and a layer of transparent rubber in between.

=== Digital speakers ===
Digital speakers have been the subject of experiments performed by Bell Labs as far back as the 1920s. The design is simple; each bit controls a driver, which is either fully on or off. Practical problems with this design have led manufacturers to abandon it. For a reasonable number of bits (required for adequate sound reproduction quality), the physical size of a speaker system becomes very large. (Note: For a 16-bit speaker, the driver for the most-significant bit must move 32768 times the air moved by the driver for the least-significant bit. The minimum practical driver size for the least-significant bit dictates a large driver for the most-significant bit, and the overall large number of drivers requires much more space than a typical 2- or 3-way analog loudspeaker system.) Compromises in implementation of an effective reconstruction filter make aliasing a significant issue.

=== Without a diaphragm ===
==== Plasma arc speakers ====
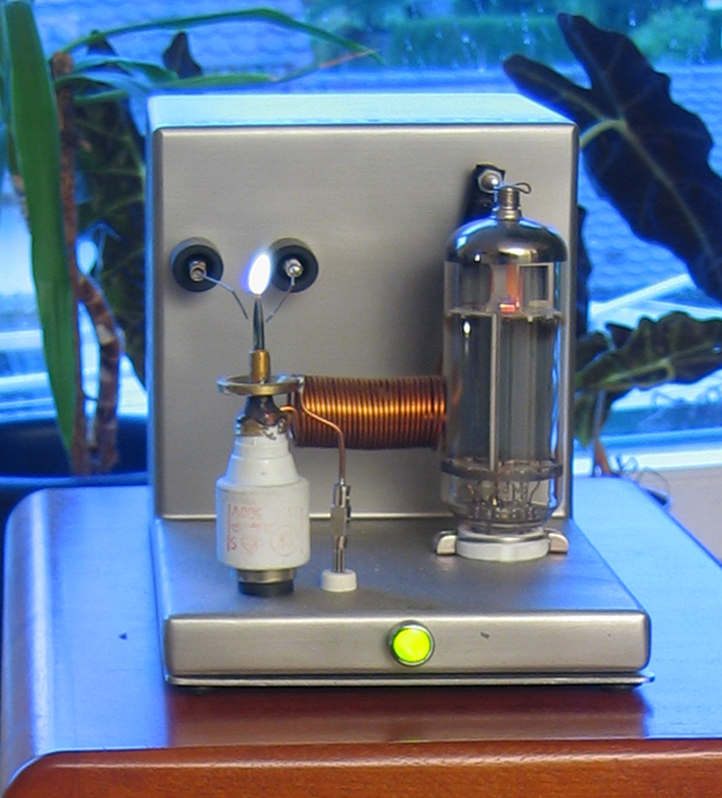
Plasma speaker

Plasma arc loudspeakers use electrical plasma as a radiating element. Since plasma has minimal mass, but is charged and therefore can be manipulated by an electric field, the result is a very linear output at frequencies far higher than the audible range. Problems of maintenance and reliability for this approach tend to make it unsuitable for mass market use. In 1978, Alan E. Hill of the Air Force Weapons Laboratory in Albuquerque, NM, designed the Plasmatronics Hill Type I, a tweeter whose plasma was generated from helium gas. This avoided the ozone and NOx produced by RF decomposition of air in an earlier generation of plasma tweeters made by the pioneering DuKane Corporation, who produced the Ionovac (marketed as the Ionofane in the UK) during the 1950s.

A less expensive variation on this theme is the use of a flame for the driver, as flames contain ionized (electrically charged) gases.

==== Thermoacoustic speakers ====
In 2008, researchers of Tsinghua University demonstrated a thermoacoustic loudspeaker (or thermophone) of carbon nanotube thin film, whose working mechanism is a thermoacoustic effect. Sound frequency electric currents are used to periodically heat the CNT and thus result in sound generation in the surrounding air. The CNT thin film loudspeaker is transparent, stretchable and flexible. In 2013, researchers of Tsinghua University further present a thermoacoustic earphone of carbon nanotube thin yarn and a thermoacoustic surface-mounted device. They are both fully integrated devices and compatible with Si-based semiconducting technology.

==== Rotary woofers ====
A rotary woofer is essentially a fan with blades that constantly change their pitch, allowing them to easily push the air back and forth. Rotary woofers are able to efficiently reproduce subsonic frequencies, which are difficult to impossible to achieve on a traditional speaker with a diaphragm. They are often employed in movie theaters to recreate rumbling bass effects, such as explosions.

== See also ==
- Audiophile
- Bandwidth extension
- Digital speaker
- Directional sound
- Earphone
- Echo cancellation
- Electronics
- Ferrofluid § Heat transfer
- Guitar speaker
- Headphones
- High-end audio
- Isobaric loudspeaker
- List of loudspeaker manufacturers
- Loudspeaker acoustics
- Long Range Acoustic Device (LRAD)
- Music center
- Parabolic loudspeaker
- Phase plug
- Planephones
- Rotary woofer
- Shelf stereo
- Sound from ultrasound
- Soundbar
- Speaker driver
- Speaker stands
- Speaker wire
- Speakerphone
- Studio monitor
- Super tweeter
- Surround sound
