= Plasmatronics =

Plasmatronics is a company, founded by former Air Force Weapons Laboratory (now Phillips Laboratory) scientist Dr. Alan E. Hill, which produced a plasma speaker design. This was first demonstrated at the 1978 Winter Consumer Electronics Show.

The product used a conventional dynamic loudspeaker with an integrated amplifier for low frequencies. For a tweeter it used a plasma speaker as a near-massless driver. Uniquely, to prevent ozone and NOx emissions it sourced helium from a tank in the back of the unit.

While praised for accurate sound reproduction at demonstrations, the system had a number of disadvantages, including high cost and periodic handling of heavy compressed helium cylinders.
