= Edward W. Kellogg =

American inventor

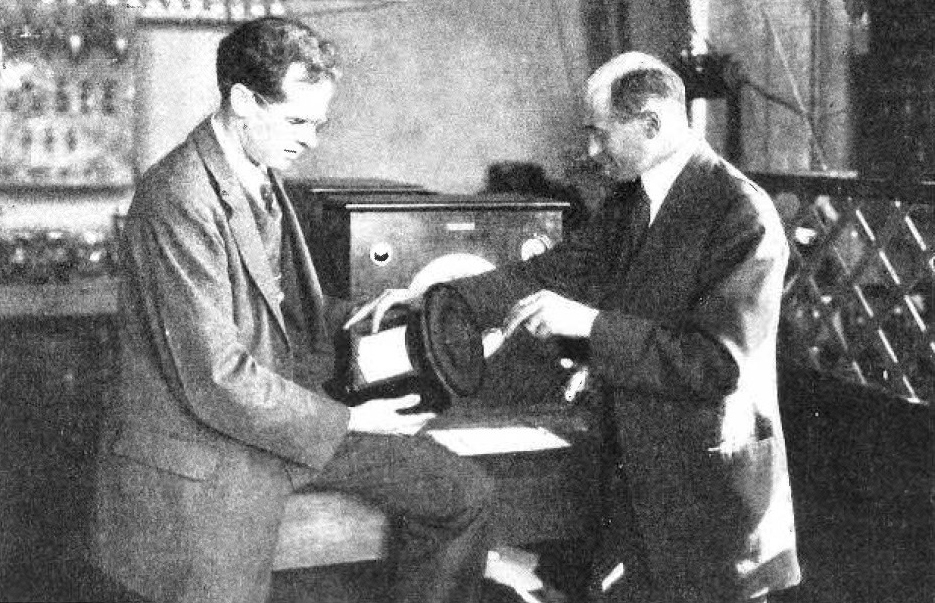
Edward W. Kellogg and Chester W. Rice with the moving coil loudspeaker in 1925

Edward Washburn Kellogg (February 20, 1883 – May 29, 1960) was an American inventor who invented the moving coil loudspeaker in 1925 along with Chester W. Rice at General Electric

== Biography ==
He was born in Washington in 1883. He was a graduate of Phillips Academy, in Andover (Class of 1902)

He was the joint inventor of the moving coil loudspeaker in 1925 along with Chester W. Rice at General Electric, and independently by Edward Wente at Bell Labs. Kellogg also patented an electrostatic loudspeaker in 1934.

Kellogg was the first director of the GE Advanced Technology Laboratory in Schenectady, New York, which later became a part of RCA Victor in Camden, New Jersey (and is now part of Lockheed Martin).

He died in 1960.
