= Lincoln Walsh =

American inventor (1903-1971)

Lincoln Walsh (November 3, 1903 – November 17, 1971) was an engineer and inventor.

== Early life and education ==
Walsh received his B.S. in electrical engineering from Stevens Institute of Technology in 1926. He later studied at Columbia University and at Brooklyn Polytechnic Institute.

== Career ==
During World War II, he worked with Rudy Bozak at the Dinion Coil Company in Caledonia, New York, developing high voltage power supplies for radar use. Walsh worked as a member of the War Planning Board.

After the war, he founded Brooks Electronics Inc.

Walsh may have been involved in the development of the Kettledrum Baffle that one associates with the first Bozak speaker systems. He redesigned the "Mark II" (Colossus computer) power supply to prolong the unit's life. Later, he was a consultant on very large transformer designs for power distribution. He also developed a high-quality AM radio receiver and an aircraft collision avoidance system.

Walsh´s interests extended to loudspeaker design. With the help of Bozak, he developed a direct-radiator design using a single speaker with an aluminum foil cone, operating out of a vertical column, and offering a wide frequency response. A Simple Quality Rating System for Loudspeakers and Audio Systems appeared in the Journal of the Audio Engineering Society for July, 1963. He went on to invent the wide-range coherent transmission-line loudspeaker, which was granted U.S. Patent 3,424,873 in 1969 (filed in 1964). Walsh realized that if you took an inverted cone and drove it from the apex, you could have a speaker with a perfect 360-degree horizontal radiation pattern available to reproduce all the audible frequency range. The vertical dispersion was controllable with the choice of materials. This offered a wide variety of designs, based on his patent.

== Personal life ==
As a member of the War Planning Board, he met and later married Harriet Walsh. They were residents of Millington, New Jersey for many years. They had no children.

== Legacy ==
In 1971, Martin Gersten founded Ohm Acoustics. Gersten raised the capital needed to buy back the Walsh patent rights from a metal-casting company which had invested with Walsh. Walsh's new speaker design was developed and marketed by Ohm (the Ohm 'A'), after Gersten invented an edge-wound anodized aluminum voice coil, U.S. Patent 3,935,402 (1974), which was needed to make the unit viable. Unfortunately, Walsh died before his speaker was released to the public. Ohm Chief Engineer, John Strohbeen, further developed Walsh's concepts.
