= Rudy Bozak =

American audio engineer

Rudolph Thomas Bozak
- Born: 1910; Uniontown, Pennsylvania
- Died: February 8, 1982 (aged 72)
- Other names: Rudy Bozak, R. T. Bozak, Rudi T. Bozak
- Occupations: Engineer, designer, entrepreneur, owner
- Employer(s): Allen-Bradley; Cinaudagraph; Dinion Coil Company; C.G. Conn; Wurlitzer; R. T. Bozak Mfg. Co. Bozak, Inc. N.E.A.R.
- Spouse: Lillian Gilleski
- Children: Lillian, Mary and Barbara

Rudolph Thomas Bozak (1910–1982) was an audio electronics and acoustics designer and engineer in the field of sound reproduction. His parents were Bohemian Czech immigrants; Rudy was born in Uniontown, Pennsylvania. Bozak studied at Milwaukee School of Engineering; in 1981, the school awarded him an honorary doctorate in engineering. Bozak married Lillian Gilleski; the two had three daughters: Lillian, Mary and Barbara.

== Loudspeakers ==
Fresh out of college in 1933, Rudy Bozak began working for Allen-Bradley, an electronics manufacturer based in Milwaukee, Wisconsin. Bozak would later employ Allen-Bradley components in his own electronic designs.

Bozak moved to the East Coast in 1935 to work for Cinaudagraph out of Stamford, Connecticut. Two years later he was chief engineer. At the 1939 New York World's Fair, a tower topped with a cluster of eight 27" Cinaudagraph loudspeakers in 30" frames with huge 450 lb. field coil magnets covered low frequency duties for a 2-way PA system at Flushing Meadows. The loudspeakers were mounted into horns with 14' wide mouths and were each driven by a 500 watt amplifier derived from a high-power radio broadcast tube. In June 1940, Electronics magazine published an article that Bozak had written about the design of the 27" loudspeaker.

During World War II, Bozak worked with Lincoln Walsh at Dinion Coil Company in Caledonia, New York developing very high voltage power supplies for radar.

Bozak joined C.G. Conn in 1944 to help them develop an electronic organ. While in Elkhart, Indiana, he noticed that the human sense of hearing was unpredictable at best. Years later, Bozak recounted this story about the Conn electronic organ project: "The general sales manager, who was a pianist and played organ, sat down and played the thing and said it was great, just what we were looking for. A week later he was invited back into the laboratory and sat down and played the instrument again. He didn’t play ten or fifteen bars when he said, This goddamn thing doesn’t sound right. What did you guys do to it?’ We said we hadn’t done anything. Well, he didn’t believe us. ‘You did something to it. You messed it up here,’ he said. ‘Restore it back to the way you had it.’ So what we did was let the damn instrument sit there for another week, and he comes back and plays it again. ‘Now this is the way it should be,’ he says."

In 1948 Bozak moved his family to North Tonawanda, New York to develop organ loudspeakers for Wurlitzer. While there, Bozak experimented at home in a loudspeaker laboratory he housed in his basement. One design of his featured a kettle drum shell as the loudspeaker enclosure.

In 1950 Bozak was hired as a consultant by McIntosh Laboratory to develop a square loudspeaker driver unit but it was not an engineering success. In 1952 he was making driver units for the McIntosh F100 speaker system. Though these sold reasonably well, McIntosh did not develop the design further. This experience led him to form his own company, Bozak Loudspeakers, in Stamford, Connecticut.

Bozak met Emory Cook in the early 1950s; the two hit it off and began working in a shared warehouse basement facility in Stamford. Cook and Bozak thrilled the audio world in 1951 with Cook's ground-breaking stereo recording of train sounds at night: Rail Dynamics. Together, Bozak and Cook implemented a stereo loudspeaker system that would be able to show Cook's stereo recordings to best effect.

By the mid-1950s, Bozak had expanded into new quarters at 587 Connecticut Avenue in South Norwalk, with an export office in Hicksville, New York.

The foundation of Bozak loudspeaker design was the unique Bozak cone. The woofer cone was molded from a slurry containing paper pulp, lamb's wool and other ingredients in a secret process. The cone was made thicker at the center, becoming progressively thinner toward the periphery. An additional doping of the inner area further strengthened the cone center. The result was a cone with 'variable density' from center to rim with virtually no breakup or standing waves, the major sources of distortion in more conventional paper cones.

The original midrange and tweeter cones were paper. In 1961 the B-209 midrange cone was changed to a radical new design. The material was very thin spun aluminum which took much of its strength from its curvilinear profile along the radius. The cone received a thin coating of latex in order to damp the surface reflections that otherwise would occur on a metal surface which is vibrated rapidly. The design was patented and was largely responsible for the superb transient response of the Bozak B-209B and B-209C midrange.

In 1961 the original B-200X paper-cone tweeter re-appeared as the B-200Y, using the same basic cone design of the midrange.

The Concert Grand was the crown jewel of Bozak speaker systems since its introduction in 1951. This refrigerator-sized speaker system originally contained four B-199 12" woofers, one 8 Ohm B-209 6" midrange driver and eight tweeters. The B-310 and B-310A were the mono versions in which the tweeters were arranged as a sector of a sphere for widest distribution of high frequencies. The 'stereo' B-310B and B-400 had the eight tweeters arranged in a vertical row. All Concert Grand models starting from the B-310A contained two 16 Ohm B-209 midrange drivers. The Concert Grand loudspeakers were designed to fill large spaces and were not at their best with listeners closer than 20 feet away. In 1965, a pair of B-410 Concert Grands cost US$2000. Such a high price limited ownership to a small number of hi-fi aficionados and audiophiles. The model line continued to be manufactured by Bozak until 1977. Henry Mancini and Benny Goodman, good friends of Rudy Bozak, owned Concert Grand speaker systems. Jack Webb put a pair in his Mark VII Productions listening room.

In 1961, Bozak introduced the B-4000 Symphony. This was sort of "half a Concert Grand," using two 12" woofers, one midrange and the same vertical array of eight tweeters as the Concert Grands. Again, the Symphony was considered to have better imaging than its "big brother" (which was also consider by some listeners to be bass heavy) but was at its best when listeners were no closer than 15 feet. The Symphony was eventually offered in four cabinet styles.

The backbone of the Bozak line was the B-302A system, offered in several cabinet styles over a period of years. The 302A systems consisted of one 12" woofer, one midrange driver and one tweeter pair. A 'starter' version, the B-300, was a 2-way system consisting of one 12" woofer and one tweeter pair mounted across the front of the woofer. A single capacitor sufficed as the crossover 'network' for the B-300. The system could be expanded to a 3-way B-302A by adding a midrange and full 3-way Bozak crossover.

Acoustic suspension arrived in the loudspeaker marketplace in 1955, making it possible to get low bass from a small, bookshelf-sized enclosure. This seriously affected the sales of "big box" speaker systems of all brands. Rudy Bozak never offered an acoustic suspension speaker system; he stated that the full transient response and clean bass for which his woofers were famous could not be obtained with the heavier, reinforced woofer cones necessary for acoustic suspension. Bozak began offering smaller speaker systems to answer consumer demand, but none were noted for exceptional performance until the LS-200 and LS-200A of the late 1970s.

=== Commercial sound ===
For commercial sound reinforcement, Bozak introduced a biamped columnar loudspeaker in 1962. In 1963, the newly established commercial loudspeaker division was employing about 60 people dedicated to manufacturing the columnar model which was proving a great success. At 18 years of age Bob Betts was hired as Rudy's lab technician, but was soon put in charge of the Acoustics Lab, in 1965. Betts became chief engineer in 1968 after returning from the Vietnam war. Rudy Bozak and Betts traveled extensively on company business and Bozak often tutored Betts with his college work.

For the 1964 New York World's Fair, Bozak again put forward a new loudspeaker design; this time in the Vatican Pavilion. Hemispherical ceiling-mounted loudspeakers (the CM-109-2) were developed and installed with great success.

Bozak accepted occasional United States Department of Defense contracts including an underwater low frequency driver intended for acoustic communication between ocean-going vessels and a vibration platform that Bozak employees called "The Shaker" which was meant to test the integrity of electronic assemblies in action.

The company name changed from "R.T. Bozak Co." to "Bozak, Inc" in the mid- 1960s.

== Electronics ==
=== DJ mixers ===
Bozak is often remembered today for his advanced designs of DJ mixers which allowed the development of the concept of disc jockey mixing and 'discotheques'. Beginning with the Bozak CMA-6-1 and CMA-10-1, 6 and 10-input monaural units of the mid 1960s, the peak of development was reached with the stereo Bozak CMA-10-2DL; a unit that was very quickly accepted as the standard of its day. The Bozak CMA mixers were very expensive: they used high-grade Allen-Bradley components, hand-selected transistors, and were of modular construction for ease of servicing and expansion.

C/M Laboratories, co-founded by Wayne Chou and Nick Morris, collaborated with Rudy Bozak, in the mid-1960s on the construction of basic mono mixers and power amplifiers. C/M Labs designed the CMA-10 mixer intended for orchestral sound reinforcement; it was produced in small quantities. C/M Labs also designed and built amplifiers and other integrated electronics for Bozak and used Bozak speakers to test their gear. In 1968 Bozak brought these electronic products into the Bozak factory and developed them further. The CMA-10-2 and 10-2DL mixer was designed at Bozak for sale to discotheques.

Bozak didn't cease production of DJ mixers until some years after the death of Rudy Bozak. Meanwhile the design of the famed CMA series of mixers was cloned by UREI as their model 1620 until they ceased production at which point the mixer was cloned by Rane as their model 2016a. In 2005, Soundcraft began to offer a UREI-Soundcraft badged 1620LE, with 'LE' standing for 'Limited Edition'.

The Bozak brand is now owned by Analog Developments Ltd. who have released electronic products such as the ISO-X isolator and the AR-6 DJ mixer. They own the website www.bozak.com. The Bozak brand as of 2016 does not make speakers or carry parts.

=== Digital delay ===
Bozak developed an electronic digital delay device in the early 1970s and used it to align loudspeakers in time within event spaces. The Bozak DA-4003 delay, Bozak amplifiers and various Bozak loudspeaker models were used by Donald E. Gilbeau and Dr. J. Christopher Jaffe in 1975 to emulate a concert hall experience outdoors; Jaffe received a patent for the concept.

== Final years ==
Saul Marantz joined Bozak as consultant in the mid 1970s. He helped with esthetic details of certain products. When both Bozak and Marantz teamed up to demonstrate loudspeakers at Hi-Fi events and audio engineering conventions, a sizable crowd would form. Bozak shifted from using McIntosh amplifiers for powering his loudspeakers to using Marantz amplifiers.

The B-401 Rhapsody speaker was reviewed in August 1974, in High Fidelity, where it was said to have good power handling and a more constant impedance curve than most. Other auditors found a lack of bass response.

The last Bozak project that Rudy Bozak himself was an integral part of involved a thorough redesign of the B-200Y tweeter which had been a staple of Bozak loudspeakers since its introduction in 1962. The new design echoed earlier changes to the B-209 midrange: the standard tweeter cone shape was modified into a dished open horn shape that flattened out gradually from the center to the periphery. The new design became the B-200Z. Its basic curvilinear configuration was settled in 1974 but production didn't get underway until 1976 and early 1977. The new tweeter extended high frequency response to 16,000 Hz.

When Rudy Bozak turned 67 in 1977, he offered an opportunity for an employee buy-out headed by Bob Betts, his chief engineer. The arrangements required the personal loans of several key employees and would take a few months to transact. Bozak didn't wait for an employee buy-out; with a handshake promise to retain certain crucial employees, Rudy sold the rights to his corporation to an existing business headed by Joseph Schlig. Bozak stayed on in a minor consulting role. Quality was seen to go quickly downhill; the new owners appeared to longtime employees as being interested only in pulling money out of the operation. Betts and other company management officers left the company one by one.

Still, several good loudspeaker designs came out of a new engineering effort. In 1975, Bruce Zayde was hired by Bozak and Schlig as technical director; he began by implementing computer-aided design (CAD) as a tool, hosted on an HP 9800 running a COMTRAN program developed by Deane Jensen. Zayde introduced Thiele/Small design principles regarding system development so that loudspeakers could be optimized at the outset for any proposed configuration. The LS-300 became the first Bozak loudspeaker model to be produced wholly from a preconceived design goal. It was also the first Bozak loudspeaker with reflex ports. It was positively reviewed in April 1979, in High Fidelity.

Rudy Bozak was not in favor of using ports or vents to tune loudspeaker enclosures for greater low-frequency output from a smaller box. He was a purist; he felt that the impulse and transient response of ported designs was inferior and that the augmented bass was too boomy. By the late 1970s, this stance was considered old fashioned; the greater majority of home and professional loudspeakers were using ported designs. As the first ported loudspeaker model was being prototyped at his former company, Rudy Bozak remained skeptical but was willing to stand back and observe the results achieved using the new scientific design methods.

In 1976, Peter Ledermann was hired as assistant to Bruce Zayde but on his second day was thrust into the role of Director of Engineering; Zayde was quitting. Ledermann spent the next two years re-engineering the complete electronic product line, including putting into production the 902, a bucket-brigade based rear channel delay unit. His efforts put Bozak once again into the position of being able to produce and service electronic products reliably and repeatedly. Later, working with Richard Majestic, for whom Ledermann worked previously at RAM Audio, the two men designed the new Listener series, the LS-200A, 220-A, 330-A and others, employing a soft dome tweeter for the first time, as the Bozak tweeter did not have the top end range extension needed to attract the changing marketplace.

Ledermann relates how Rudy Bozak himself was treated by Bozak's management: "...the new owners of the company relegated him to a dark, unlit corner of the upper floor of the production building near the bundles of stocked cotton wool acoustic stuffing. At the right time of afternoon, when the light streamed in from one of the few windows, you could see the air filled with particulate matter and through it, if you knew where to look, a small, round faced man with felt cap could be usually found sitting in the dark at his old desk with the one small lamp illuminating his face." In 1979, Ledermann designed the Bozak MB80 bookshelf speaker and brought it to the marketplace. This compact loudspeaker contained a soft dome tweeter, a 6" 209-W wide range aluminum driver designed by Ledermann, and a modified first order crossover. The MB-80 employed tweeter clipping protection and indication. Rudy Bozak took note of the project, but did not participate in the design.

In early 1982, Rudy Bozak died. His wife Lillian and their son-in-law Don Parks reorganized the company and quality of workmanship made a brief comeback from 1983 to 1985. The LS-200A loudspeaker, a ported model, was reviewed in May 1984, in Stereo Review. The facility relocated several times: Newington, Bristol and New Britain but management was unable to sustain the effort. Finally, the company's assets were put into truck trailers to await final disposition. The company tooling was sold to Bill Kieltyka, president of New England Audio Resource (N.E.A.R.), an audiophile loudspeaker manufacturer based in Lewiston, Maine. N.E.A.R. redesigned the Bozak Bard outdoor speaker to have an epoxy-covered wooden enclosure rather than the original aluminum one. Much later, in 1997, Bogen bought N.E.A.R. to obtain the rights to Bozak's former outdoor speaker line. A civil court case was initiated by Seal Audio, Inc. (Joseph Schlig, CEO, President and Director) against Bozak, Inc. The Bozak name was sold to overseas interests who began to produce Bozak-branded equipment in China.

=== Legal precedent ===
In 1986, the appeal was decided in the court case between Seal Audio, Inc. and Bozak, Inc. Aside from the verdict, the case is often quoted in Connecticut state law as it established precedent in defining the timing of objections to state referees when serving as fact finders appointed by the chief justice. In Connecticut, consent is required by both parties when a state referee is appointed. Seal Audio had filed no objection to the findings of the state referee until the case was taken to appeal; the Supreme Court of Connecticut found implicit consent in Seal Audio's lack of objection at that time. The case has subsequently been quoted as meaning that "a party cannot withhold objection in anticipation of favorable outcome while reserving right to impeach decision if it later proves to be unfavorable."

== Professional organizations ==
In 1938, Bozak was elected to Associate Grade membership with the Institute of Radio Engineers.

By 1963, Bozak was on the Board of Governors of the Audio Engineering Society for two years. He served in the same capacity again for two years starting in 1970. Bozak was awarded an AES Fellowship in 1965 for "valuable contributions to the advancement in or dissemination of knowledge of audio engineering or in the promotion of its application in practice." In 1970, Rudy T. Bozak won the AES John H. Potts Award (now the Gold Medal), their highest award for outstanding, sustained achievement in the field of audio engineering.

== Patents ==
- Switch for electrical musical instruments. US patent 2567870. C.G.Conn Ltd., 1951.
- Metallic diaphragm for electrodynamic loudspeakers. US patent 3093207. R.T.Bozak Mfg. Co., 1963.
- Compliant annulus for loudspeaker and related circuit. US patent 3436494. R.T.Bozak Mfg. Co., 1969.
- Edge-damped diaphragm for electrodynamic loudspeakers. US patent 3837425. Bozak, Inc., 1973.

== Popular culture ==
Many references to Bozak (often spelled Bozack) can be found in modern hip hop music song titles and lyrics where the word can stand for the Bozak DJ mixer as well as for ability and virility:

- Newcleus Jam On It
- EPMD Get The Bozack, Back to the Rap and Mr. Bozack
- 3rd Bass Kick Em in the Grill
- Redman Jam 4 U
- Tom Browne Funkin for Jamaica
- Beastie Boys Sure Shot
- Beastie Boys Professor Booty
- House of Pain Jump Around

A producer known as "Mister Bozack" has worked with Def Jam Recordings on several rap albums for Redman and EPMD.

== See also ==
- Marantz
- McIntosh Laboratories
