= Professional audio =

Activity and category of studio-grade audio equipment

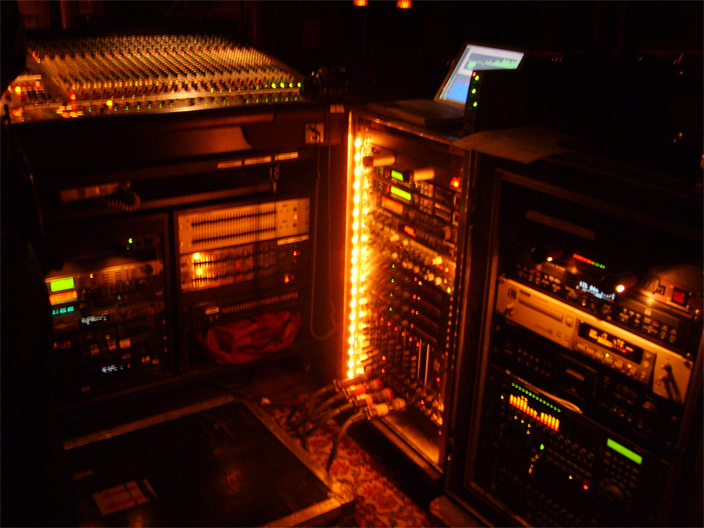
A portable setup of various live audio production and recording equipment

Professional audio, abbreviated as pro audio, refers to both an activity and a category of high-quality, studio-grade audio equipment. Typically it encompasses sound recording, sound reinforcement system setup and audio mixing, and studio music production by trained sound engineers, audio engineers, record producers, and audio technicians who work in live event support and recording using mixing consoles, recording equipment and sound reinforcement systems. Professional audio is differentiated from consumer- or home-oriented audio, which are typically geared toward listening in a non-commercial environment.

In equipment terms, professional audio gear is generally distinguished from consumer gear by its signal levels and interconnections: professional line level equipment typically operates at a nominal level of +4 dBu and uses balanced interconnections (commonly via XLR or TRS connectors), whereas consumer equipment generally operates at the lower −10 dBV nominal level over unbalanced connections. Balanced interconnection allows professional installations to run longer cable distances with greater immunity to electrical interference.

Professional audio can include, but is not limited to broadcast radio, audio mastering in a recording studio, television studio, and sound reinforcement such as a live concert, DJ performances, audio sampling, public address system set up, sound reinforcement in movie theatres, and design and setup of piped music in hotels and restaurants. Professional audio equipment is sold at professional audio stores and music stores.

== Definition ==
The term professional audio has no precise definition, but it typically includes:

- Operations carried out by trained audio engineers
- The capturing of sound with one or more microphones
- Balancing, mixing and adjusting sound signals from multitrack recording devices using a mixing console
- The control of audio levels using standardized types of metering
- Sound signals passing through lengthy signal chains involving processes at different times and places, involving a variety of skills
- Compliance with organizational, national and international practices and standards established by such bodies as the International Telecommunication Union, Audio Engineering Society and European Broadcasting Union
- Setting up or designing sound reinforcement systems or recording studios

== Stores ==
A professional audio store is a retail establishment that sells, and in many cases rents, expensive, high-end sound recording equipment (microphones, audio mixers, digital audio recorders, speakers and surround sound speakers, monitor speakers) and sound reinforcement system gear (e.g., speaker enclosure cabinets, stage monitor speakers, power amplifiers, subwoofer cabinets) and accessories used in both settings, such as microphone stands. Some pro audio stores also sell video equipment, such as video projectors, as this equipment is commonly used in live audio settings (e.g., business presentations and conventions). Some pro audio stores also sell and/or rent DJ gear (record turntables, DJ mixers) and the stage lighting equipment used in rock concerts, dance clubs, raves and theater/musical theater shows.

== See also ==
- Audio Engineering Society
- Audiophile
- Institute of Professional Sound
- Sound design
