= Sound reinforcement system =

Amplified sound system for public events

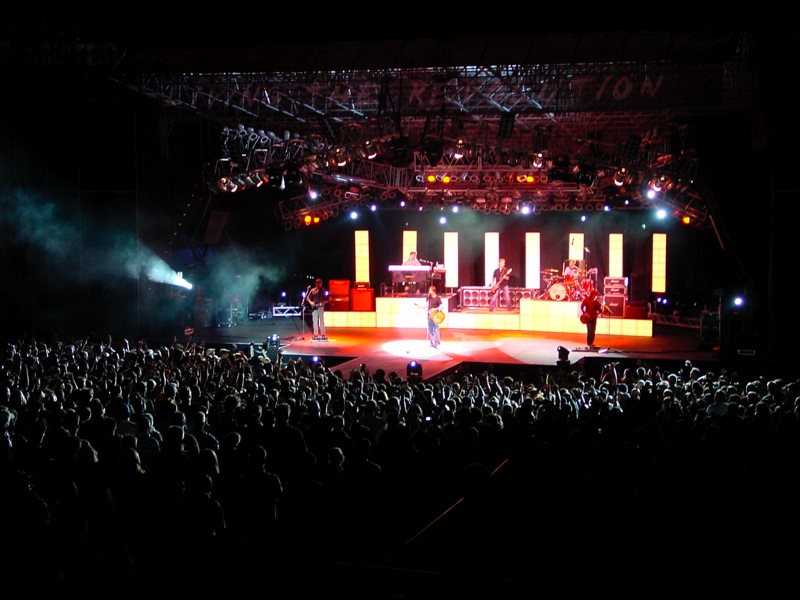
Large outdoor pop music concerts use complex and powerful sound reinforcement systems

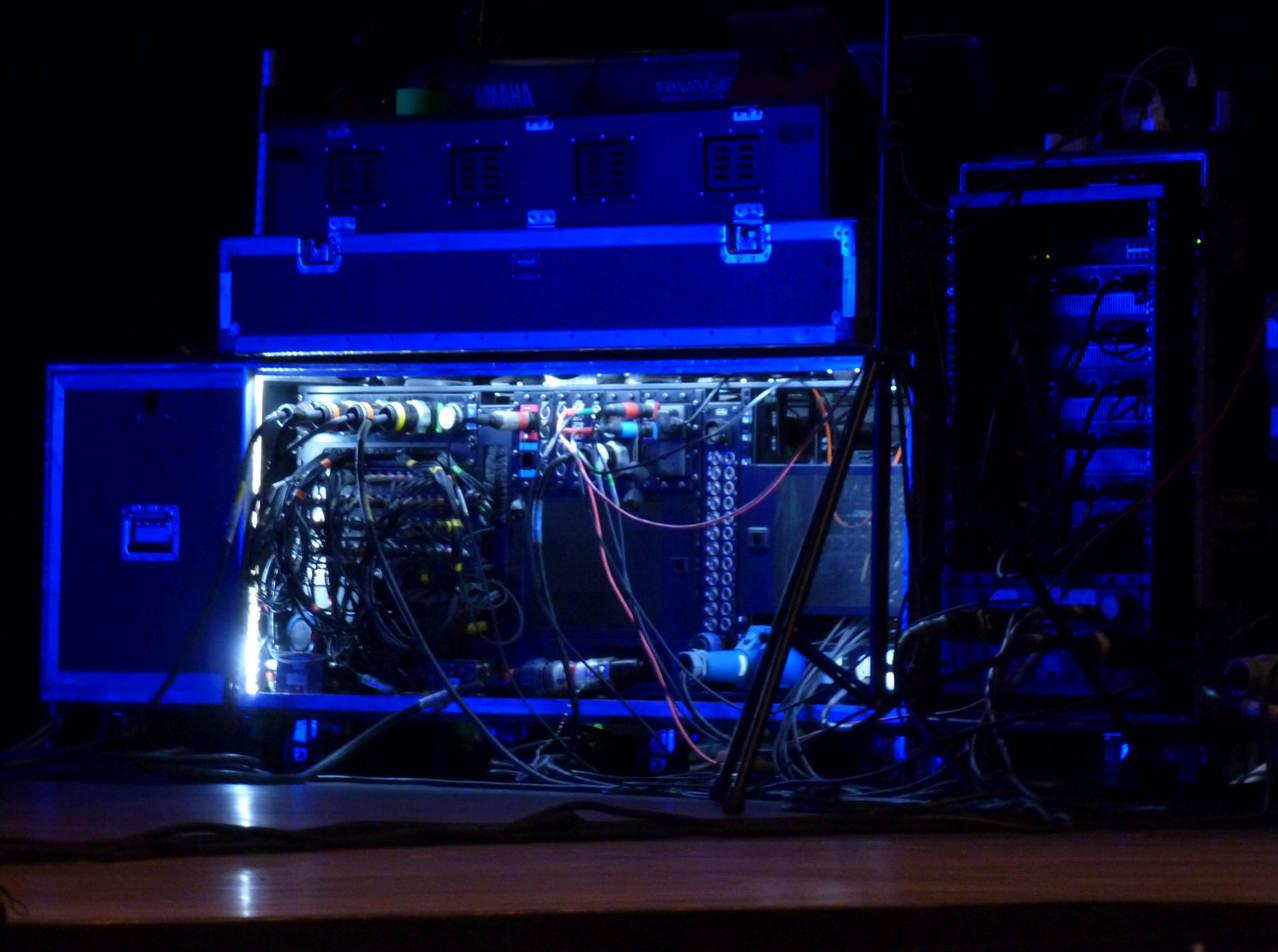
Rear panel of a medium-sized sound reinforcement system located at one side of the stage at a pop concert in a location with 3.200 seats. The setup (image covering about 3 m from left to right) includes the mixing console for the sound engineer (standing behind) and the power amplifiers, which are partly stacked in the rightmost 19-inch rack.

A sound reinforcement system is the combination of microphones, signal processors, amplifiers, and loudspeakers in enclosures all controlled by a mixing console that makes live or pre-recorded sounds louder and may also distribute those sounds to a larger or more distant audience. In many situations, a sound reinforcement system is also used to enhance or alter the sound of the sources on the stage, typically by using electronic effects, such as reverb, as opposed to simply amplifying the sources unaltered.

A sound reinforcement system for a rock concert in a stadium may be very complex, including hundreds of microphones, complex live sound mixing and signal processing systems, tens of thousands of watts of amplifier power, and multiple loudspeaker arrays, all overseen by a team of audio engineers and technicians. On the other hand, a sound reinforcement system can be as simple as a small public address (PA) system, consisting of, for example, a single microphone connected to a 100-watt amplified loudspeaker for a singer-guitarist playing in a small coffeehouse. In both cases, these systems reinforce sound to make it louder or distribute it to a wider audience.

Some audio engineers and others in the professional audio industry disagree over whether these audio systems should be called sound reinforcement (SR) systems or PA systems. Distinguishing between the two terms by technology and capability is common, while others distinguish by intended use (e.g., SR systems are for live event support and PA systems are for reproduction of speech and recorded music in buildings and institutions). In some regions or markets, the distinction between the two terms is important, though the terms are considered interchangeable in many professional circles.

== Basic concept ==
A basic sound reinforcement system that would be used in a small music venue. The main loudspeakers for the audience are to the left and right of the stage. A row of monitor speakers pointing towards the onstage performers helps them hear their singing and playing. The audio engineer sits at the back of the room, operating the mixing console, which shapes the sound and volume of all of the voices and instruments.

A typical sound reinforcement system consists of; input transducers (e.g., microphones), which convert sound energy such as a person singing into an electric signal, signal processors which alter the signal characteristics (e.g., equalizers that adjust the bass and treble, compressors that reduce signal peaks, etc.), amplifiers, which produce a powerful version of the resulting signal that can drive a loudspeaker and output transducers (e.g., loudspeakers in speaker cabinets), which convert the signal back into sound energy (the sound heard by the audience and the performers). These primary parts involve varying numbers of individual components to achieve the desired goal of reinforcing and clarifying the sound to the audience, performers, or other individuals.

=== Signal path ===
Sound reinforcement in a large format system typically involves a signal path that starts with the signal inputs, which may be instrument pickups (on an electric guitar or electric bass) or a microphone that a vocalist is singing into or a microphone placed in front of an instrument or guitar amplifier. These signal inputs are plugged into the input jacks of a thick multicore cable (often called a snake). The snake then delivers the signals of all of the inputs to one or more mixing consoles.

In a coffeehouse or small nightclub, the snake may be only routed to a single mixing console, which an audio engineer will use to adjust the sound and volume of the onstage vocals and instruments that the audience hears through the main speakers and adjust the volume of the monitor speakers that are aimed at the performers.

Mid- to large-size performing venues typically route the onstage signals to two mixing consoles: the front of house (FOH), and the stage monitor system, which is often a second mixer at the side of the stage. In these cases, at least two audio engineers are required; one to do the main mix for the audience at FOH and another to do the monitor mix for the performers on stage.

Once the signal arrives at an input on a mixing console, this signal can be adjusted in many ways by the sound engineer. A signal can be equalized (e.g., by adjusting the bass or treble of the sound), compressed (to avoid unwanted signal peaks), or panned (that is sent to the left or right speakers). The signal may also be routed into an external effects processor, such as a reverb effect, which outputs a wet (effected) version of the signal, which is typically mixed in varying amounts with the dry (effect-free) signal. Many electronic effects units are used in sound reinforcement systems, including digital delay and reverb. Some concerts use pitch correction effects (e.g., AutoTune), which electronically correct any out-of-tune singing.

Mixing consoles also have additional sends, also referred to as auxes or aux sends (an abbreviation for "auxiliary send"), on each input channel so that a different mix can be created and sent elsewhere for another purpose. One usage for aux sends is to create a mix of the vocal and instrument signals for the monitor mix (this is what the onstage singers and musicians hear from their monitor speakers or in-ear monitors). Another use of an aux send is to select varying amounts of certain channels (via the aux send knobs on each channel), and then route these signals to an effects processor. A common example of the second use of aux sends is to send all of the vocal signals from a rock band through a reverb effect. While reverb is usually added to vocals in the main mix, it is not usually added to electric bass and other rhythm section instruments.

The processed input signals are then mixed to the master faders on the console. The next step in the signal path generally depends on the size of the system in place. In smaller systems, the main outputs are often sent to an additional equalizer, or directly to a power amplifier, with one or more loudspeakers (typically two, one on each side of the stage in smaller venues, or a large number in big venues) that are connected to that amplifier. In large-format systems, the signal is typically first routed through an equalizer then to a crossover. A crossover splits the signal into multiple frequency bands with each band being sent to separate amplifiers and speaker enclosures for low, middle, and high-frequency signals. Low-frequency signals are sent to amplifiers and then to subwoofers, and middle and high-frequency sounds are typically sent to amplifiers which power full-range speaker cabinets. Using a crossover to separate the sound into low, middle and high frequencies can lead to a "cleaner", clearer sound (see bi-amplification) than routing all of the frequencies through a single full-range speaker system. Nevertheless, many small venues still use a single full-range speaker system, as it is easier to set up and less expensive.

== System components ==
=== Input transducers ===
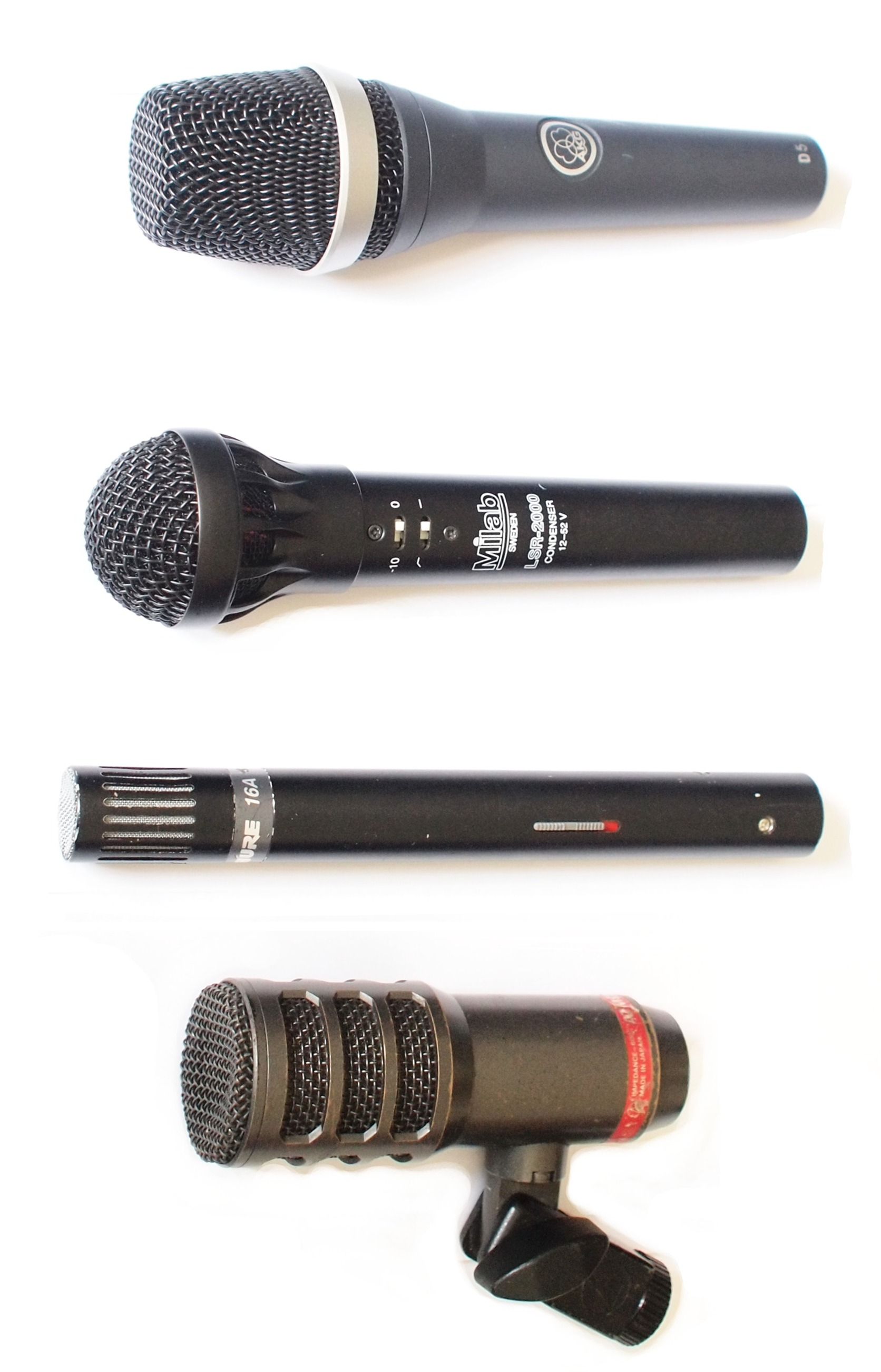
Audio engineers use a range of microphones for different live sound applications.

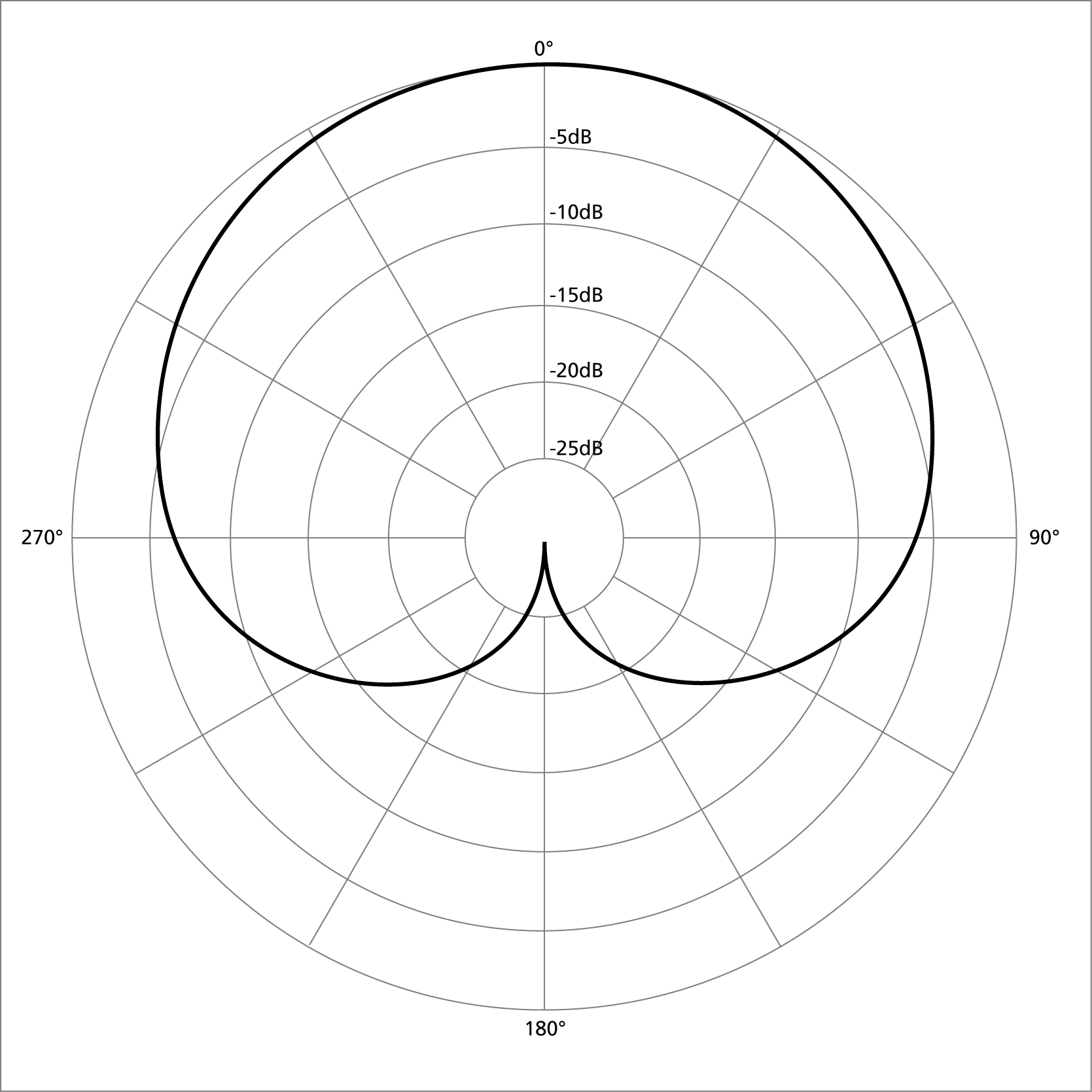
Cardioid mics are widely used in live sound, because their "apple-shaped" pickup pattern rejects sounds from the sides and rear of the mic, making it more resistant to unwanted feedback "howls".

Many types of input transducers can be found in a sound reinforcement system, with microphones being the most commonly used input device. Microphones can be classified according to their method of transduction, polar pattern or their functional application. Most microphones used in sound reinforcement are either dynamic or condenser microphones. One type of directional microphone, called cardioid mics, are widely used in live sound, because they reduce pickup from the side and rear, helping to avoid unwanted feedback from the stage monitor system.

Microphones used for sound reinforcement are positioned and mounted in many ways, including base-weighted upright stands, podium mounts, tie-clips, instrument mounts, and headset mounts. Microphones on stands are also placed in front of instrument amplifiers to pick up the sound. Headset-mounted and tie-clip-mounted microphones are often used with wireless transmission to allow performers or speakers to move freely. Early adopters of headset mounted microphones technology included country singer Garth Brooks, Kate Bush, and Madonna.

Other types of input transducers include magnetic pickups used in electric guitars and electric basses, contact microphones used on stringed instruments, and pianos and phonograph pickups (cartridges) used in record players. Electronic instruments such as synthesizers can have their output signal routed directly to the mixing console. A DI unit may be necessary to adapt some of these sources to the inputs of the console.

=== Wireless ===
Wireless systems are typically used for electric guitar, bass, handheld microphones and in-ear monitor systems. This lets performers move about the stage during the show or even go out into the audience without the worry of tripping over or disconnecting cables.

=== Mixing consoles ===
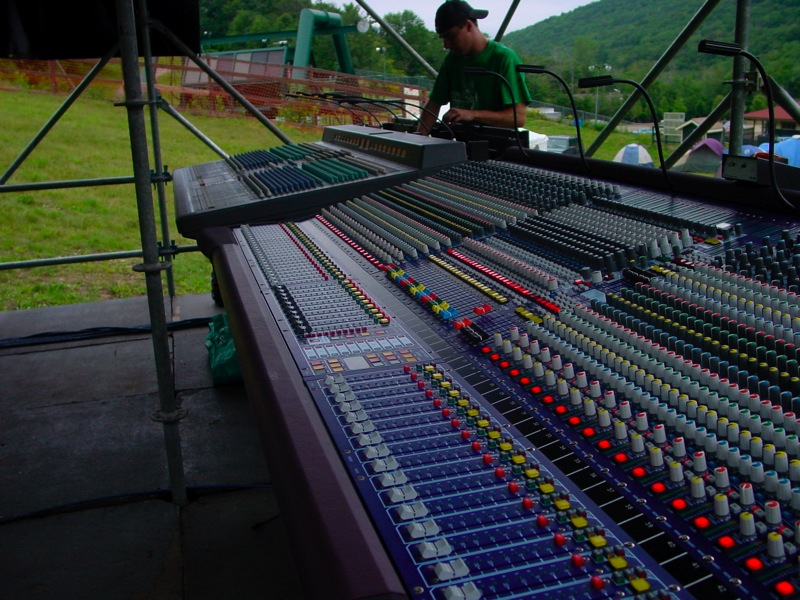
A Yamaha PM4000 and a Midas Heritage 3000 mixing console at the front of house position at an outdoor concert.

Mixing consoles are core to a sound reinforcement system. This is where the sound engineer can adjust the volume and tone of each input, whether it is a vocalist's microphone or the signal from an electric bass, and mix, equalize and add effects to these sound sources. Doing the mixing for a live show requires a mix of technical and artistic skills. A sound engineer needs to have an expert knowledge of speaker and amplifier set-up, effects units and other technologies and a good ear for what the music should sound like in order to create a good mix.

Multiple consoles can be used for different purposes in a single sound reinforcement system. The front-of-house (FOH) mixing console is typically located where the operator can see the action on stage and hear what the audience hears. For broadcast and recording applications, the mixing console may be placed within an enclosed booth or outside in an OB van. Large music productions often use a separate stage monitor mixing console which is dedicated to creating mixes for the performers on-stage. These consoles are typically placed at the side of the stage so that the operator can communicate with the performers on stage. (Note: In cases where performers have to play at a venue that does not have a monitor engineer near the stage, the monitor mixing is done by the FOH engineer from the FOH console. This arrangement can be problematic because the performers end up having to request changes to the monitor mixes with "...hand signals and clever cryptic phrases" which may be misunderstood. The engineer also cannot hear the changes that he is applying to the monitors on stage, often resulting in a reduction of the quality of the onstage monitor mix.)

=== Signal processors ===
Small PA systems for venues such as bars and clubs are now available with features that were formerly only available on professional-level equipment, such as digital reverb effects, graphic equalizers, and, in some models, feedback prevention circuits which electronically sense and prevent audio feedback when it becomes a problem. Digital effects units may offer multiple pre-set and variable reverb, echo and related effects. Digital loudspeaker management systems offer sound engineers digital delay (to ensure speakers are in sync with each other), limiting, crossover functions, EQ filters, compression and other functions in a single rack-mountable unit. In previous decades, sound engineers typically had to transport a substantial number of rack-mounted analog effects unit devices to accomplish these tasks.

==== Equalizers ====
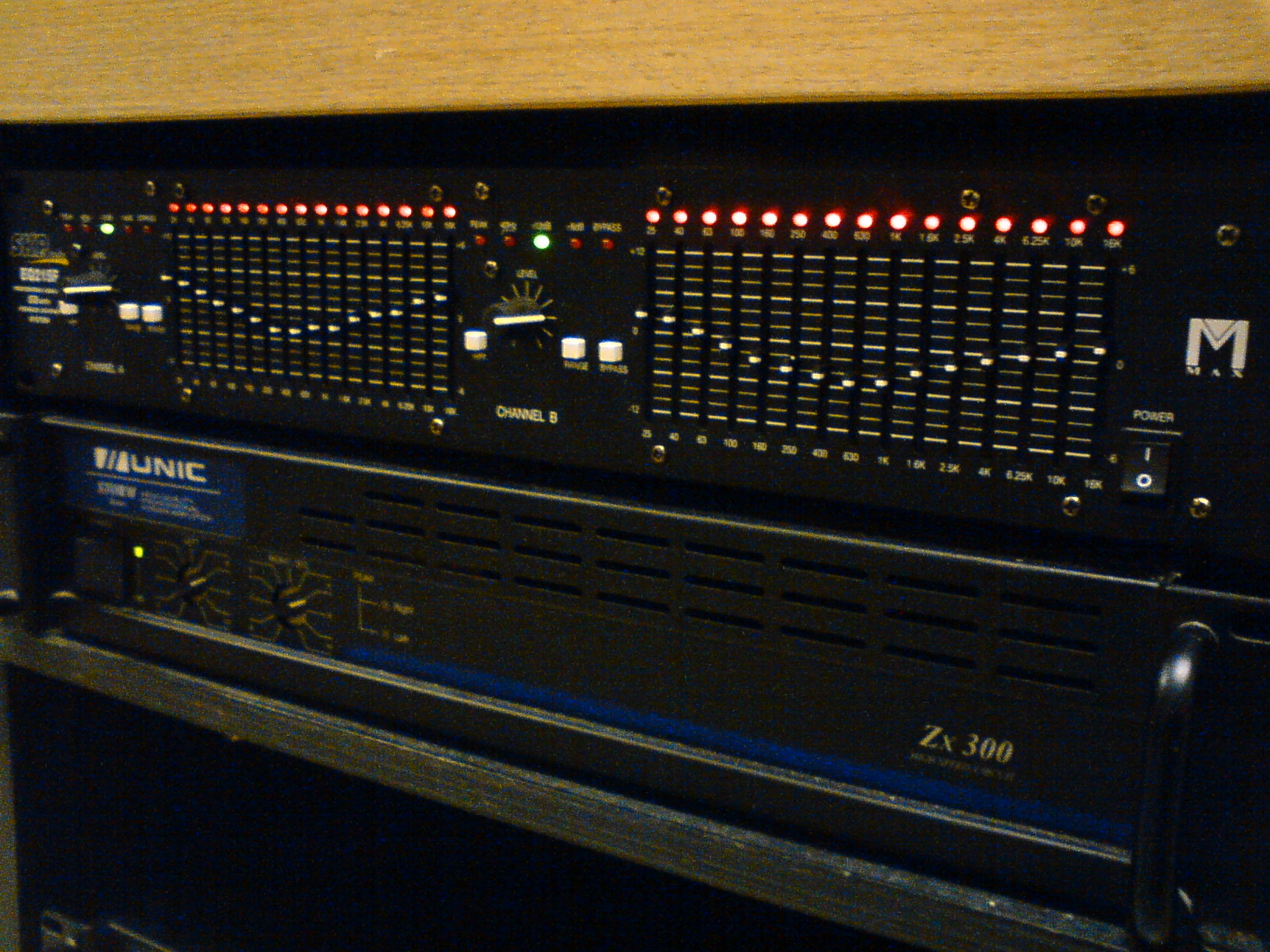
Graphic equalizer

Equalizers are electronic devices that allow audio engineers to control the tone and frequencies of the sound in a channel, group (e.g., all the mics on a drumkit) or an entire stage's mix. The bass and treble controls on a home stereo are a simple type of equalizer. Equalizers exist in professional sound reinforcement systems in three forms: shelving equalizers (typically for a whole range of bass and treble frequencies), graphic equalizers and parametric equalizers. Graphic equalizers have faders (vertical slide controls) which together resemble a frequency response curve plotted on a graph. The faders can be used to boost or cut specific frequency bands.

Using equalizers, frequencies that are too weak, such as a singer with modest projection in their lower register, can be boosted. Frequencies that are too loud, such as a boomy sounding bass drum, or an overly resonant dreadnought guitar can be cut. Sound reinforcement systems typically use graphic equalizers with one-third octave frequency centers. These are typically used to equalize output signals going to the main loudspeaker system or the monitor speakers on stage. Parametric equalizers are often built into each channel in mixing consoles, typically for the mid-range frequencies. They are also available as separate rack-mount units that can be connected to a mixing board. Parametric equalizers typically use knobs and sometimes buttons. The audio engineer can select which frequency band to cut or boost, and then use additional knobs to adjust how much to cut or boost this frequency range. Parametric equalizers first became popular in the 1970s and have remained the program equalizer of choice for many engineers since then.

A high-pass (low-cut) and/or low-pass (high-cut) filter may also be included on equalizers or audio consoles. High-pass and low-pass filters restrict a given channel's bandwidth extremes. Cutting very low-frequency sound signals (termed infrasonic, or subsonic) reduces the waste of amplifier power which does not produce audible sound and which moreover can be hard on the subwoofer drivers. A low-pass filter to cut ultrasonic energy is useful to prevent interference from radio frequencies, lighting control, or digital circuitry creeping into the power amplifiers. Such filters are often paired with graphic and parametric equalizers to give the audio engineer full control of the frequency range. High-pass filters and low-pass filters used together function as a band-pass filter, eliminating undesirable frequencies both above and below the auditory spectrum. A band-stop filter, does the opposite. It allows all frequencies to pass except for one band in the middle. A feedback suppressor, using a microprocessor, automatically detects the onset of feedback and applies a narrow band-stop filter (a notch filter) at specific frequency or frequencies pertaining to the feedback.

==== Compressors ====
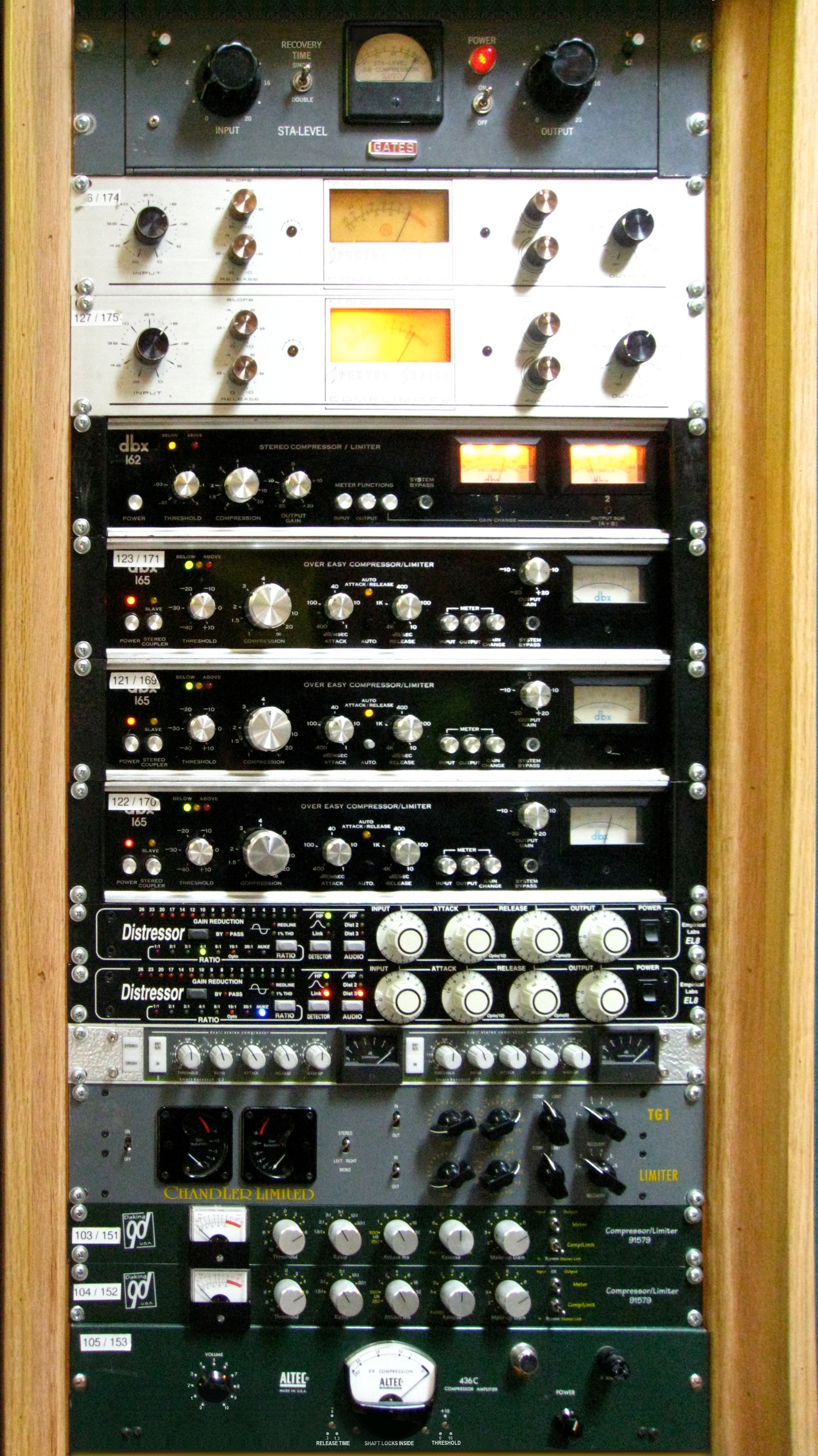
A rack of electronic audio compressors

Dynamic range compression is designed to help the audio engineer to manage the dynamic range of audio signals. Prior to the invention of automatic compressors, audio engineers accomplished the same goal by "riding the faders", listening carefully to the mix and lowering the faders of any singer or instrument which was getting too loud. A compressor accomplishes this by reducing the gain of a signal that is above a defined level (the threshold) by a defined amount determined by the ratio setting. Most compressors available are designed to allow the operator to select a ratio within a range typically between 1:1 and 20:1, with some allowing settings of up to ∞:1. A compressor with a high compression ratio is typically referred to as a limiter. The speed at which the compressor adjusts the gain of the signal (attack and release) is typically adjustable as is the final output or make-up gain of the device.

Compressor applications vary widely. Some applications use limiters for component protection and gain structure control. Artistic signal manipulation using a compressor is a subjective technique widely utilized by mix engineers to improve clarity or to creatively alter the signal in relation to the program material. An example of artistic compression is the typical heavy compression used on the various components of a modern rock drum kit. The drums are processed to be perceived as sounding more punchy and full.

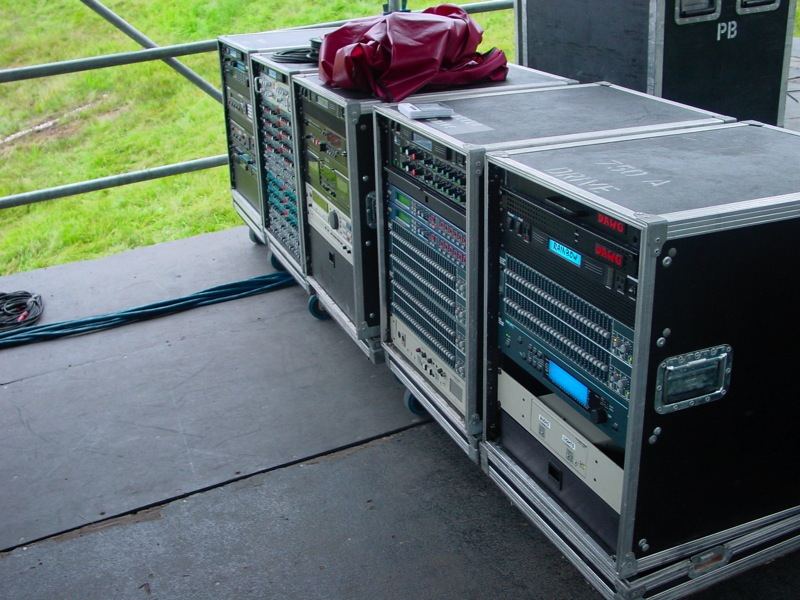
Effect processing rack-mounted units at the FOH position at an outdoor concert.

==== Noise gates ====
A noise gate mutes signals below a set threshold level. A noise gate's function is in, a sense, opposite to that of a compressor. Noise gates are useful for microphones which will pick up noise that is not relevant to the program, such as the hum of a miked electric guitar amplifier or the rustling of papers on a minister's lectern. Noise gates are also used to process the microphones placed near the drums of a drum kit in many hard rock and metal bands. Without a noise gate, the microphone for a specific instrument such as the floor tom will also pick up signals from nearby drums or cymbals. With a noise gate, the threshold of sensitivity for each microphone on the drum kit can be set so that only the direct strike and subsequent decay of the drum will be heard, not the nearby sounds.

==== Effects ====
Reverberation and delay effects are widely used in sound reinforcement systems to enhance the sound of the mix and create a desired artistic effect. Reverb and delay add a sense of spaciousness to the sound. Reverb can give the effect of a singing voice or instrument being present in anything from a small room to a massive hall, or even in a space that does not exist in the physical world. The use of reverb often goes unnoticed by the audience, as it often sounds more natural than if the signal was left dry (without effects). Many modern mixing boards designed for live sound include on-board reverb effects.

Other effects include modulation effects such as Flanger, phaser, and chorus and spectral manipulation or harmonic effects such as the exciter and harmonizer. The use of effects in the reproduction of 2010-era pop music is often in an attempt to mimic the sound of the studio version of the artist's music in a live concert setting. For example, an audio engineer may use an AutoTune effect to produce unusual vocal sound effects that a singer used on their recordings.

The appropriate type, variation, and level of effects is quite subjective and is often collectively determined by a production's audio engineer, artists, bandleader, music producer, or musical director.

==== Feedback suppressor ====
A feedback suppressor detects unwanted audio feedback and suppresses it, typically by automatically inserting a notch filter into the signal path of the system. Audio feedback can create unwanted loud, screaming noises that are disruptive to the performance, and can damage speakers and performers' and audience members' ears. Audio feedback from microphones occurs when a microphone is too near a monitor or main speaker and the sound reinforcement system amplifies itself. Audio feedback through a microphone is almost universally regarded as a negative phenomenon, many electric guitarists use guitar feedback as part of their performance. This type of feedback is intentional, so the sound engineer does not try to prevent it.

=== Power amplifiers ===
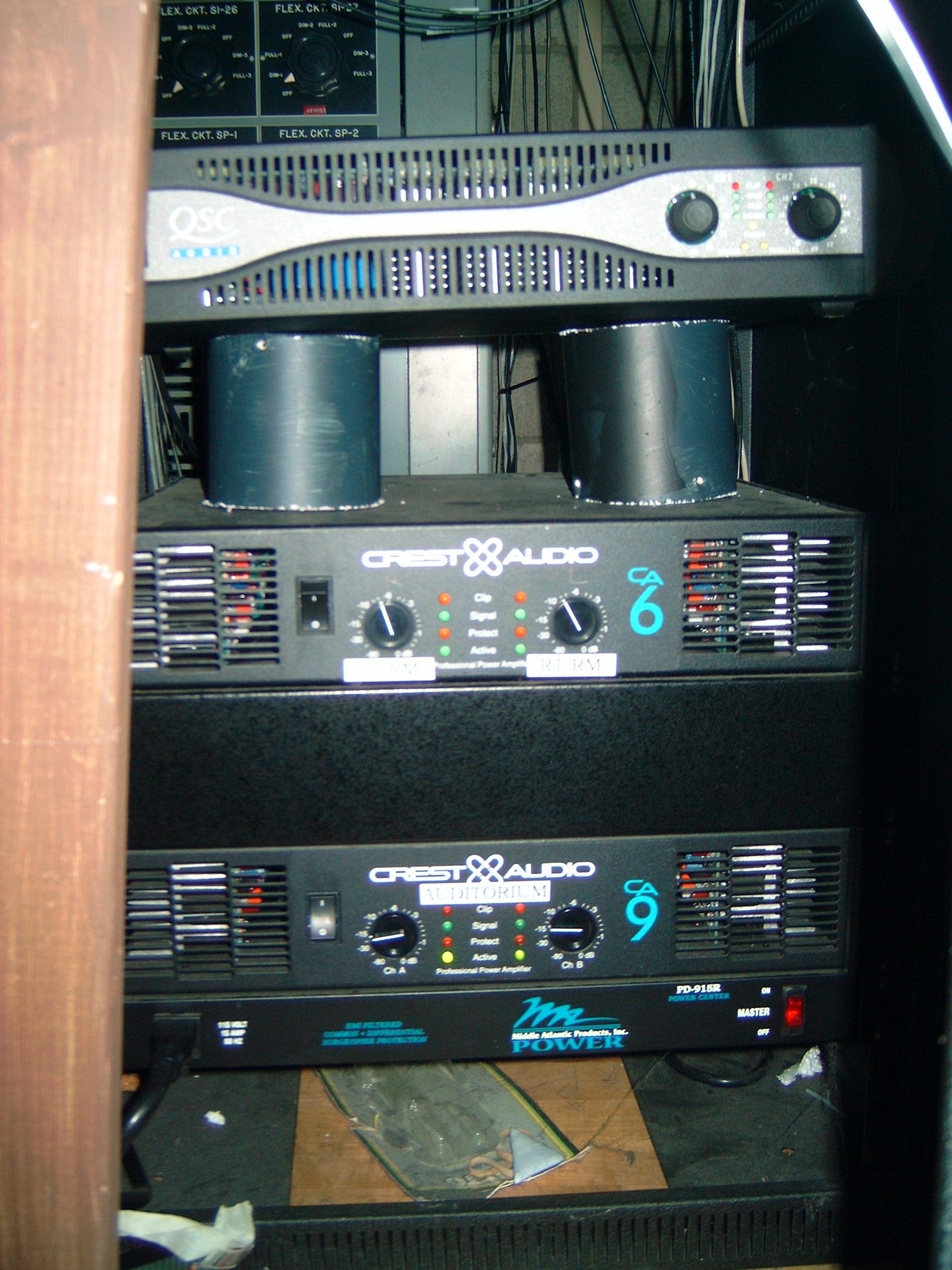
Three audio power amplifiers

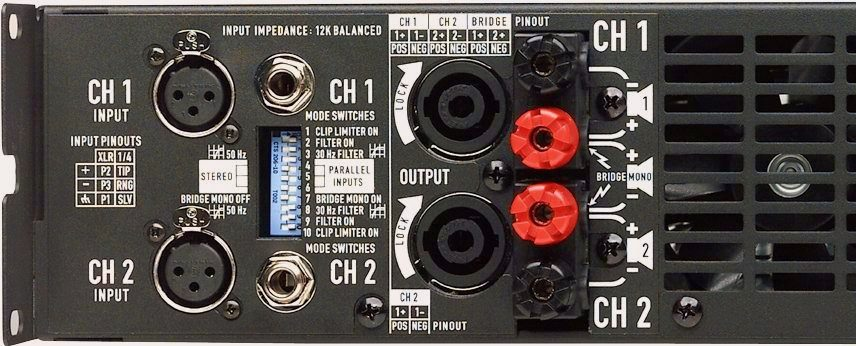
Rear panel of a power amplifier with 2 × 700 Watt (4 Ohm) - very similar to the topmost device in the image above - showing typical connectors for professional use: From left, symmetrical XLR-sockets for signal input, alternatively audio jack sockets, loudspeaker terminals of type Speakon (center), alternatively conventional screw terminals for the loudspeaker cables (black and red per channel).

A power amplifier is an electronic device that uses electrical power and circuitry to boost a line level signal and provides enough electrical power to drive a loudspeaker and produce sound. All loudspeakers, including headphones, require power amplification. Most professional audio power amplifiers also provide protection from clipping, typically as some form of limiting. A power amplifier pushed into clipping can damage loudspeakers. Amplifiers also typically provide protection against short circuits across the output and overheating.

Audio engineers select amplifiers that provide enough headroom. Headroom refers to the amount by which the signal-handling capabilities of an audio system exceed a designated nominal level. Headroom can be thought of as a safety zone allowing transient audio peaks to exceed the nominal level without damaging the system or the audio signal, e.g., via clipping. Standards bodies differ in their recommendations for nominal level and headroom. Selecting amplifiers with enough headroom helps to ensure that the signal will remain clean and undistorted.

Like most sound reinforcement equipment, professional power amplifiers are typically designed to be mounted within standard 19-inch racks. Rack-mounted amps are typically housed in road cases to prevent damage to the equipment during transportation. Active loudspeakers have internally mounted amplifiers that have been selected by the manufacturer to match the requirements of the loudspeaker. Some active loudspeakers also have equalization, crossover and mixing circuitry built in.

Since amplifiers can generate a significant amount of heat, thermal dissipation is an important factor for operators to consider when mounting amplifiers into equipment racks. Many power amplifiers feature internal fans to draw air across their heat sinks. The heat sinks can become clogged with dust, which can adversely affect the cooling capabilities of the amplifier.

In the 1970s and 1980s, most PAs employed heavy class AB amplifiers. In the late 1990s, power amplifiers in PA applications became lighter, smaller, more powerful, and more efficient, with the increasing use of switching power supplies and class D amplifiers, which offered significant weight- and space-savings as well as increased efficiency. Often installed in railroad stations, stadia, and airports, class D amplifiers can run with minimal additional cooling and with higher rack densities, compared to older amplifiers.

Digital loudspeaker management systems (DLMS) that combine digital crossover functions, compression, limiting, and other features in a single unit are used to process the mix from the mixing console and route it to the various amplifiers. Systems may include several loudspeakers, each with its own output optimized for a specific range of frequencies (i.e. bass, midrange, and treble). Bi-amping and tri-amping of a sound reinforcement system with the aid of a DLMS results in more efficient use of amplifier power by sending each amplifier only the frequencies appropriate for its respective loudspeaker and eliminating losses associated with passive crossover circuits.

=== Main loudspeakers ===
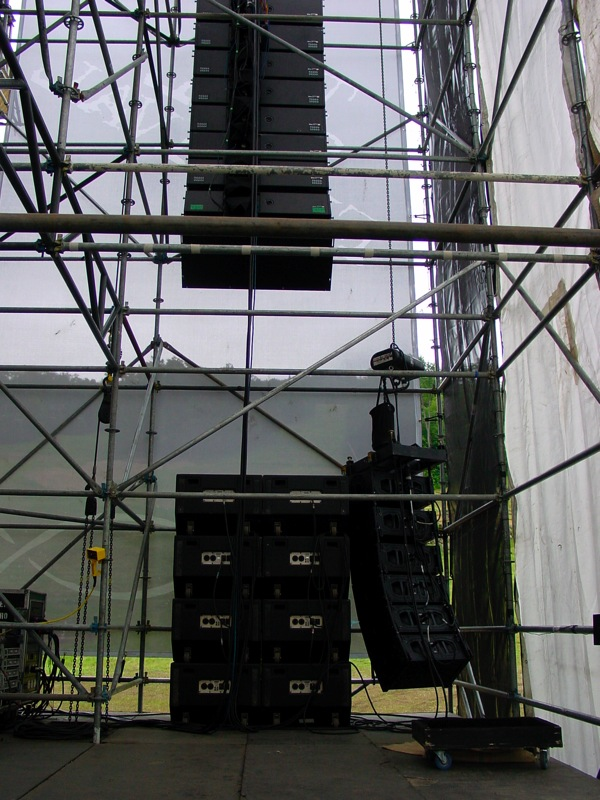
A large line array with separate subs and a smaller side fill line array.

A simple and inexpensive PA loudspeaker may have a single full-range loudspeaker driver, housed in a suitable enclosure. More elaborate, professional-caliber sound reinforcement loudspeakers may incorporate separate drivers to produce low, middle, and high frequency sounds. A crossover network routes the different frequencies to the appropriate drivers. In the 1960s, horn loaded theater and PA speakers were commonly columns of multiple drivers mounted in a vertical line within a tall enclosure.

The 1970s to early 1980s was a period of innovation in loudspeaker design with many sound reinforcement companies designing their own speakers using commercially available drivers. The areas of innovation were in cabinet design, durability, ease of packing and transport, and ease of setup. This period also saw the introduction of the hanging or flying of main loudspeakers at large concerts. During the 1980s the large speaker manufacturers started producing standard products using the innovations of the 1970s. These were mostly smaller two-way systems with 12, 15 or double 15-inch woofers and a high frequency driver attached to a high frequency horn. The 1980s also saw the start of loudspeaker companies focused on the sound reinforcement market.

The 1990s saw the introduction of line arrays, where long vertical arrays of loudspeakers in smaller cabinets are used to increase efficiency and provide even dispersion and frequency response. Trapezoidal-shaped enclosures became popular as this shape allowed many of them to be easily arrayed together. This period also saw the introduction of inexpensive molded plastic speaker enclosures mounted on tripod stands. Many feature built-in power amplifiers which made them practical for non-professionals to set up and operate successfully. The sound quality available from these simple powered speakers varies widely depending on the implementation.

Many sound reinforcement loudspeaker systems incorporate protection circuitry to prevent damage from excessive power or operator error. Resettable fuses, specialized current-limiting light bulbs, and circuit breakers were used alone or in combination to reduce driver failures. During the same period, the professional sound reinforcement industry made the Neutrik Speakon NL4 and NL8 connectors the standard speaker connectors, replacing 1/4-inch jacks, XLR connectors, and Cannon multipin connectors which are all limited to a maximum of 15 amps of current. XLR connectors are still the standard input connector on active loudspeaker cabinets.

To help users avoid overpowering them, loudspeakers have a power rating (in watts) which indicates their maximum power capacity. Thanks to the efforts of the Audio Engineering Society (AES) and the loudspeaker industry group ALMA in developing the EIA-426 testing standard, power-handling specifications became more trustworthy.

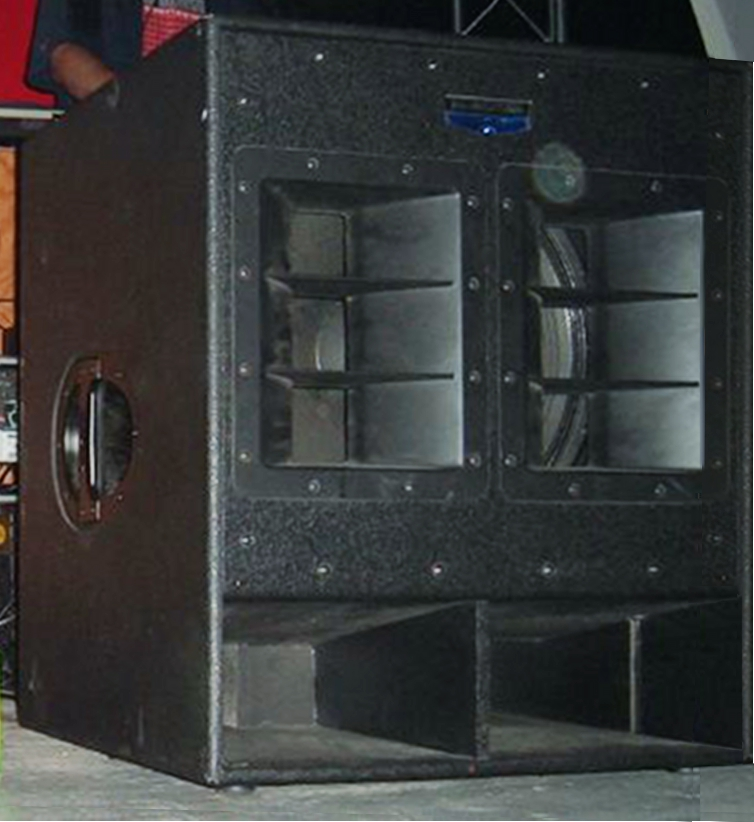
An 18-inch Mackie subwoofer cabinet.

Lightweight, portable speaker systems for small venues route the low-frequency parts of the music (electric bass, bass drum, etc.) to a powered subwoofer. Routing the low-frequency energy to a separate amplifier and subwoofer can substantially improve the bass response of the system. Also, clarity may be enhanced because low-frequency sounds can cause intermodulation and other distortion in speaker systems.

Professional sound reinforcement speaker systems often include dedicated hardware for safely flying them above the stage area, to provide more even sound coverage and to maximize sightlines within performance venues.

=== Monitor loudspeakers ===
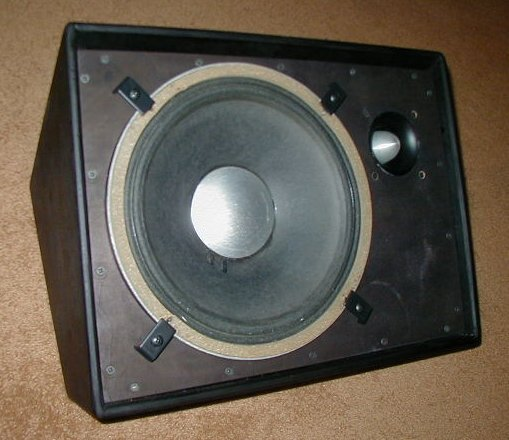
A JBL floor monitor speaker cabinet with a 12 in (30 cm) woofer and a "bullet" tweeter. Most monitor cabinets have a metal grille or woven plastic mesh to protect the loudspeaker.

Monitor loudspeakers, also called foldback loudspeakers, are speaker cabinets used onstage to help performers to hear their singing or playing. As such, monitor speakers are pointed towards a performer or a section of the stage. They are generally sent a different mix of vocals or instruments than the mix that is sent to the main loudspeaker system. Monitor loudspeaker cabinets are often a wedge shape, directing their output upwards towards the performer when set on the floor of the stage. Simple two-way, dual-driver designs with a speaker cone and a horn are common, as monitor loudspeakers need to be smaller to save space on the stage. These loudspeakers typically require less power and volume than the main loudspeaker system, as they only need to provide sound for a few people who are in relatively close proximity to the loudspeaker. Some manufacturers have designed loudspeakers for use either as a component of a small PA system or as a monitor loudspeaker. A number of manufacturers produce powered monitor speakers, which contain an integrated amplifier.

Using monitor speakers instead of in-ear monitors typically results in an increase of stage volume, which can lead to more feedback issues and progressive hearing damage for the performers in front of them. The clarity of the mix for the performer on stage is also typically compromised as they hear more extraneous noise from around them. The use of monitor loudspeakers, active (with an integrated amplifier) or passive, requires more cabling and gear on stage, resulting in a more cluttered stage. These factors, amongst others, have led to the increasing popularity of in-ear monitors.

=== In-ear monitors ===
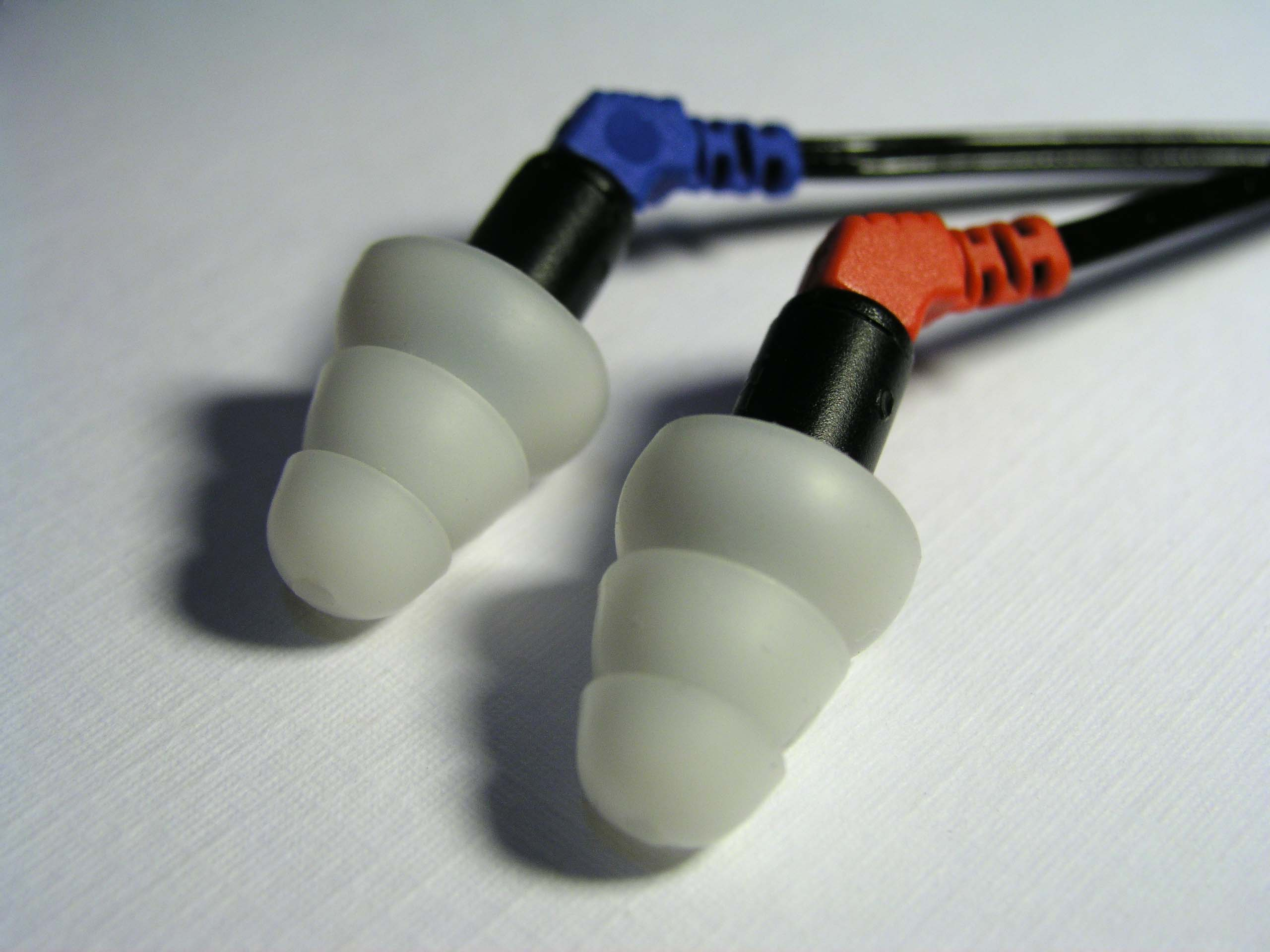
A pair of universal fit in-ear monitors. This particular model is the Etymotic ER-4S

In-ear monitors are headphones that have been designed for use as monitors by a live performer. They are either of a universal fit or custom fit design. The universal fit in-ear monitors feature rubber or foam tips that can be inserted into virtually anybody's ear. Custom-fit in-ear monitors are created from an impression of the user's ear that has been made by an audiologist. In-ear monitors are almost always used in conjunction with a wireless transmitting system, allowing the performer to freely move about the stage while receiving their monitor mix.

In-ear monitors offer considerable isolation for the performer using them: no on-stage sound is heard and the monitor engineer can deliver a much more accurate and clear mix for the performer. With in-ear monitors, each performer can be sent their own customized mix; although this was also the case with monitor speakers, the in-ear monitors of one performer cannot be heard by the other musicians. A downside of this isolation is that the performer cannot hear the crowd or the comments from other performers on stage that do not have microphones (e.g., if the bass player wishes to communicate to the drummer). This has been remedied in larger productions by setting up microphones facing the audience that can be mixed into the in-ear monitor sends.

Since their introduction in the mid-1980s, in-ear monitors have grown to be the most popular monitoring choice for large touring acts. The reduction or elimination of loudspeakers other than instrument amplifiers on stage has allowed for cleaner and less problematic mixing for both the front of house and monitor engineers. Audio feedback is greatly reduced and there is less sound reflecting off the back wall of the stage out into vocal mics and the audience, which improves the clarity of the front-of-house mix.

== Applications ==
Sound reinforcement systems are used in a broad range of different settings, each of which poses different challenges.

=== Rental systems ===
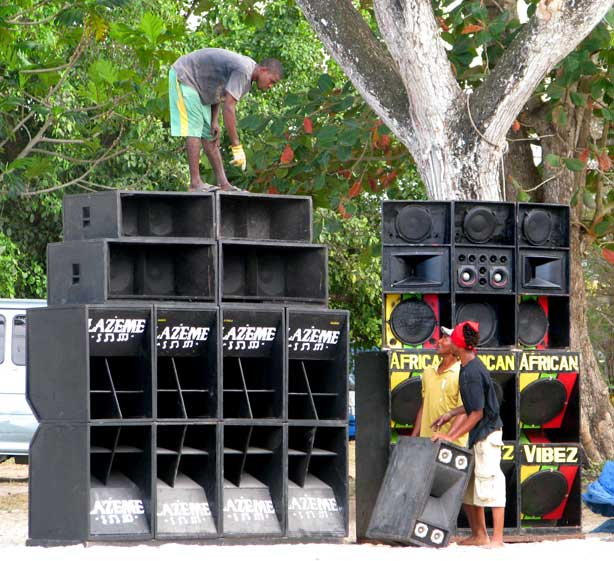
Staff set up sound system speaker cabinets for an outdoor event.

Audio-visual rental systems have to be able to withstand heavy use and even abuse from renters. For this reason, rental companies tend to own speaker cabinets that are heavily braced and protected with steel corners, and electronic equipment such as power amplifiers or effects are often mounted into protective road cases. Rental companies also tend to select gear that have electronic protection features, such as speaker-protection circuitry and amplifier limiters.

Rental systems for non-professionals need to be easy to use and set up and they must be easy to repair and maintain for the renting company. From this perspective, speaker cabinets need to have easy-to-access horns, speakers, and crossover circuitry, so that repairs or replacements can be made.

Many touring acts and large venue corporate events will rent large sound reinforcement systems that typically include one or more audio engineers on staff with the renting company. In the case of rental systems for tours, there are typically several audio engineers and technicians from the rental company that tour with the band to set up and calibrate the equipment. The individual that mixes the band is often selected and provided by the band, as they are familiar with the various aspects of the show and understand how the band wants the show to sound.

=== Live music clubs and dance events ===
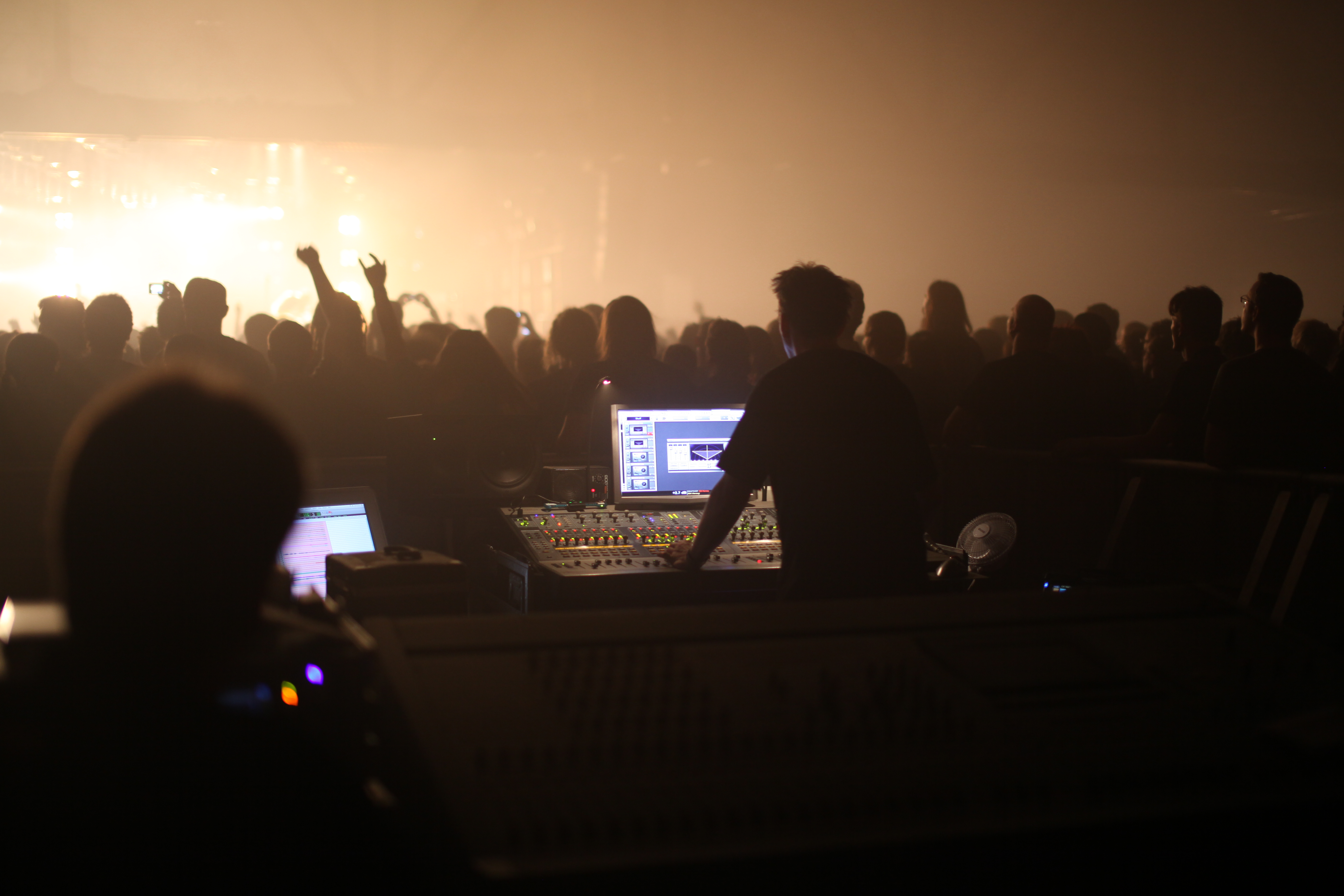
A front-of-house sound engineer with a Digidesign D-Show Profile live digital mixer and a computer monitor.

Setting up sound reinforcement for live music clubs and dance events often poses unique challenges, because there is such a large variety of venues that are used as clubs, ranging from former warehouses or music theaters to small restaurants or basement pubs with concrete walls. Dance events may be held in huge warehouses, aircraft hangars or outdoor spaces. In some cases, clubs are housed in multi-story venues with balconies or in L-shaped rooms, which makes it hard to get a consistent sound for all audience members. The solution is to use fill-in speakers to obtain good coverage, using a delay to ensure that the audience does not hear the same reinforced sound at different times.

The number of subwoofer speaker cabinets and power amplifiers dedicated to low-frequency sounds used in a club depends on the type of club, the genres of music played there, and the size of the venue. A small coffeehouse where traditional folk, bluegrass or jazz groups are the main performers may have no subwoofers, and instead rely on the full-range main PA speakers to reproduce bass sounds. On the other hand, a club where hard rock or heavy metal music bands play or a nightclub where DJs play dance music may have multiple large subwoofers, as these genres and music styles typically use powerful, deep bass sound.

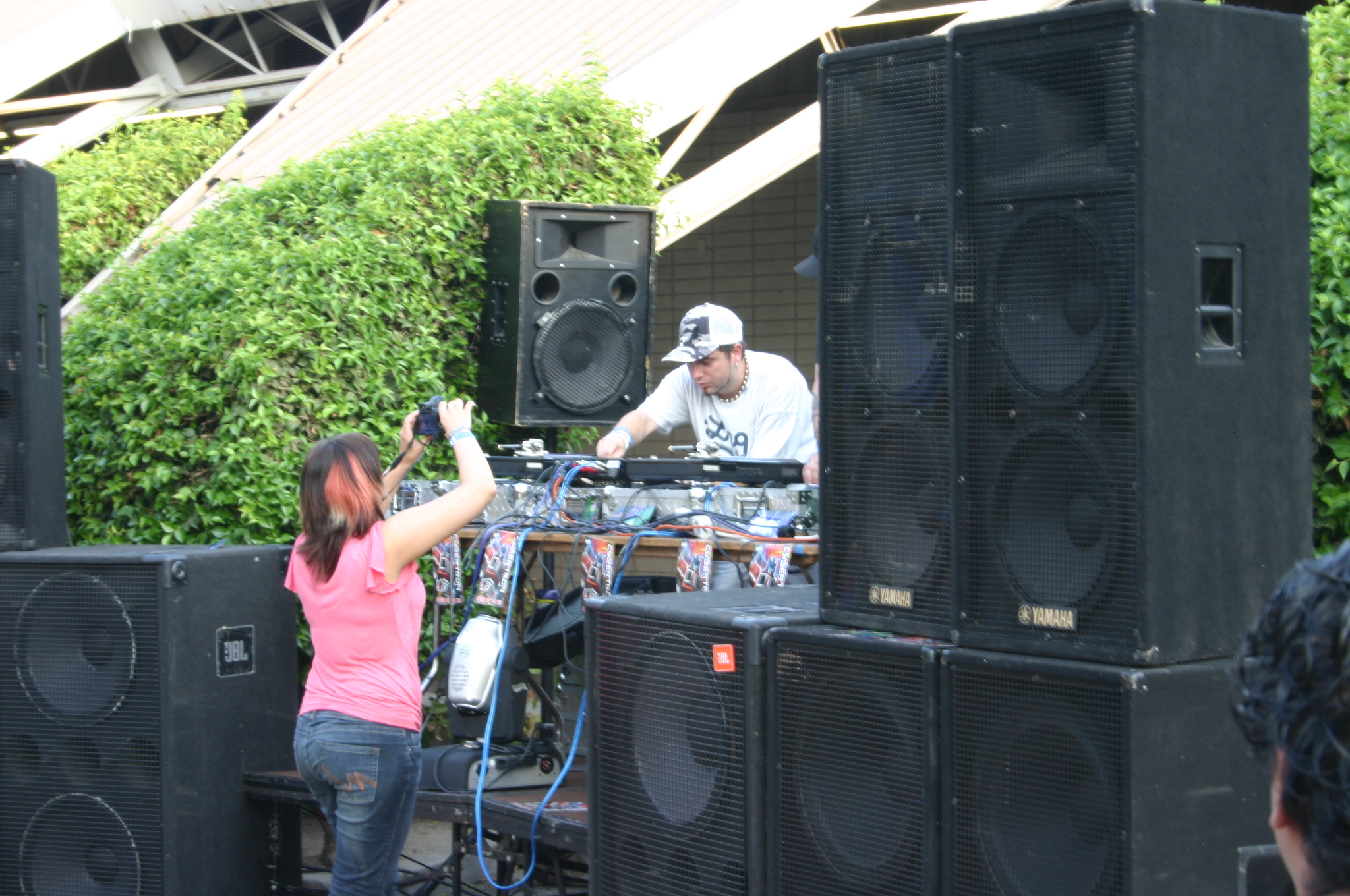
A DJ gets his decks ready as the speaker cabinets are set up and readied for a dance event.

A challenge with designing sound systems for clubs is that the sound system may need to be used for both prerecorded music played by DJs and live music. A club system designed for DJs needs a DJ mixer and space for record players. In contrast, a live music club needs a mixing board designed for live sound, an onstage monitor system, and a multicore snake cable running from the stage to the mixer. Clubs that feature both types of shows may face challenges providing the desired equipment and set-up for both uses. Clubs can be a hostile environment for sound gear, in that the air may be hot, humid, and smoky. In some clubs, keeping power amplifiers cool may be a challenge.

=== Houses of worship ===
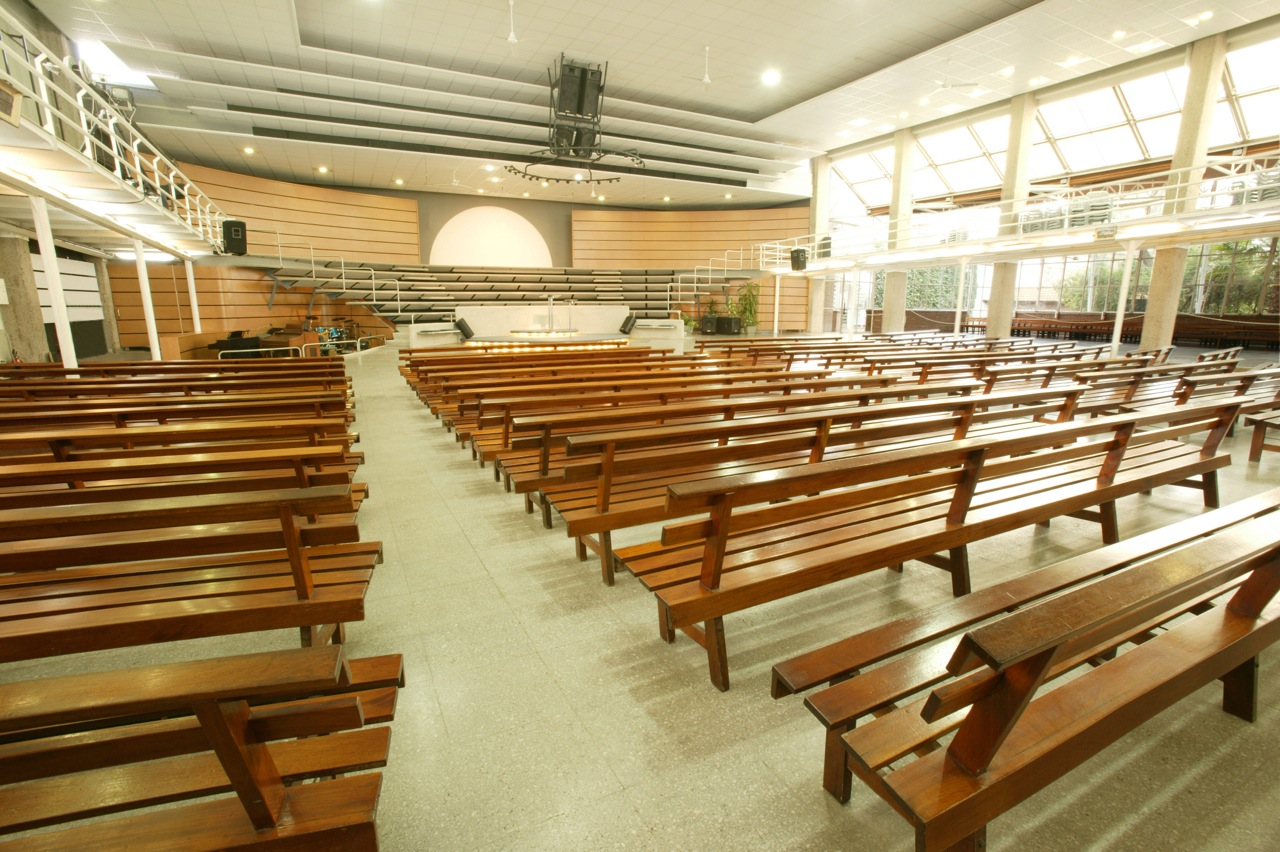
The Iglesia Los Olivos church. P.A. speakers are mounted on the ceiling to reproduce the speech of the minister.

Churches and similar houses of worship often pose design challenges. Speakers may need to be unobtrusive to blend in with antique woodwork and stonework. In some cases, audio designers have designed custom-painted speaker cabinets. Some facilities, such as sanctuaries or chapels are long rooms with low ceilings and additional fill-in speakers are needed throughout the room to give good coverage. Once installed, church systems are often operated by amateur volunteers from the congregation, which means that they must be easy to operate and troubleshoot. To this end, some mixing consoles designed for houses of worship have automatic mixers, which turn down unused channels to reduce noise, and automatic feedback elimination circuits which detect and notch out frequencies that are feeding back. These features may also be available in multi-function consoles used in convention facilities and multi-purpose venues.

=== Touring systems ===
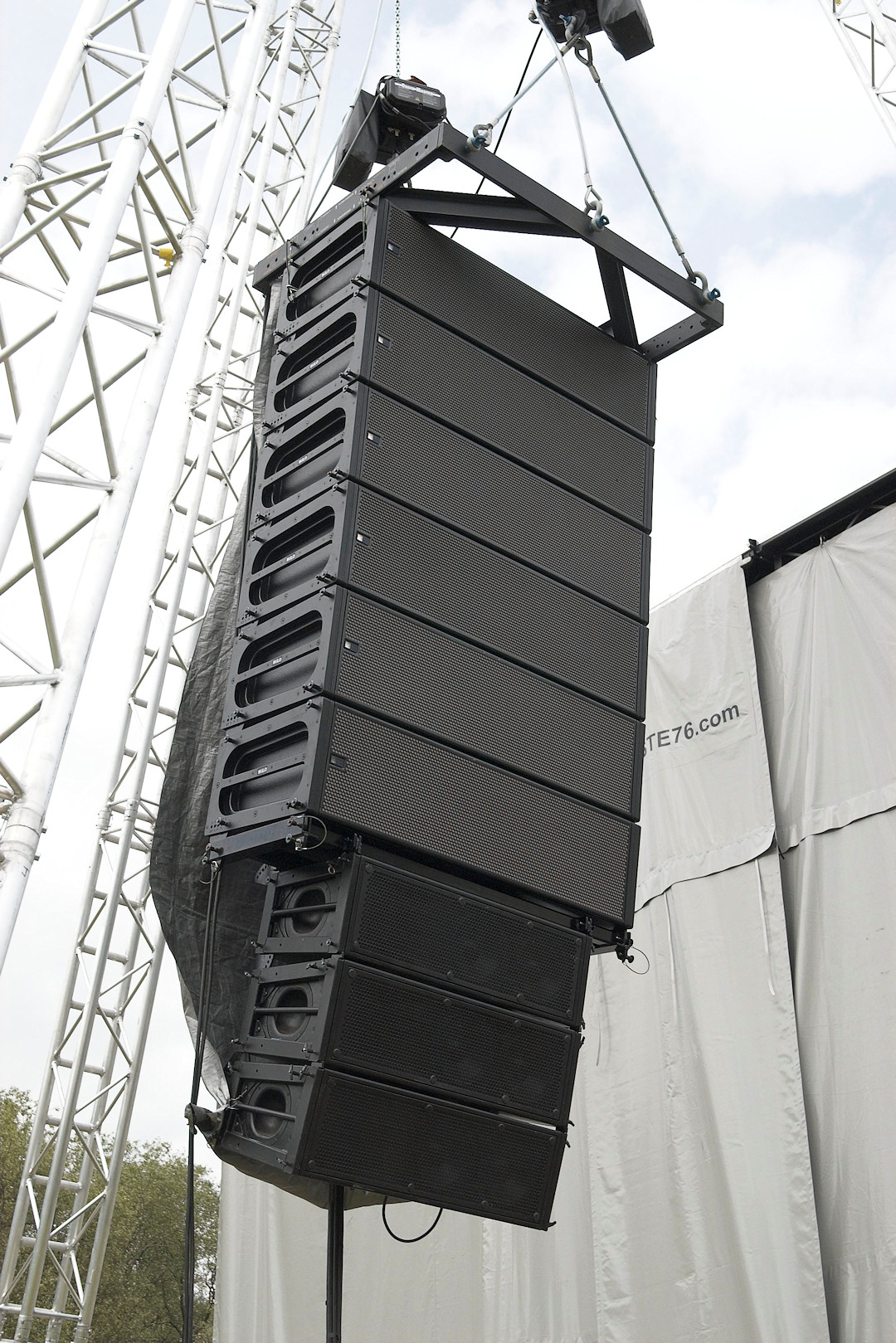
A Meyer line array of speaker cabinets is moved into position at an outdoor concert.

Touring sound systems are available in many different sizes and shapes as they have to be powerful and versatile enough to cover many different halls and venues. Touring systems range from mid-sized systems for bands playing nightclub and other mid-sized venues to large systems for groups playing stadiums, arenas and outdoor festivals. Tour sound systems are often designed with substantial redundancy features, so that in the event of equipment failure or amplifier overheating, the system will continue to function. Touring systems for bands performing for crowds of a few thousand people and up are typically set up and operated by a team of technicians and engineers who travel with the performers to every show.

Mainstream bands that are going to perform in mid- to large-sized venues during their tour schedule one to two weeks of technical rehearsal with the entire concert system and production staff, including audio engineers, at hand. This allows the audio and lighting engineers to become familiar with the show and establish presets on their digital equipment (e.g., digital mixers) for each part of the show, if needed. Many modern musical groups work with their front of house and monitor mixing engineers during this time to establish what their general idea is of how the show and mix should sound, both for themselves on stage and for the audience.

This often involves programming different effects and signal processing for use on specific songs, to make the songs sound somewhat similar to the studio versions. To manage a show with a lot of effects changes, the mixing engineers for the show often choose to use a digital mixing console so that they can save and automatically recall these many settings in between each song. This time is also used by the system technicians to get familiar with the specific combination of gear that is going to be used on the tour and how it acoustically responds during the show. These technicians remain busy during the show, making sure the SR system is operating properly and that the system is tuned correctly, as the acoustic response of a room or venue will respond differently throughout the day depending on the temperature, humidity, and number of people in the room or space.

=== Live theater ===
Sound for live theater, operatic theater, and other dramatic applications may pose problems similar to those of churches; theaters may be in heritage buildings where speakers and wiring is required to blend in with the architecture. The need for clear sightlines may make the use of regular speaker cabinets unacceptable; instead, slim, low-profile speakers are often used instead.

In live theater and drama, performers move around onstage, which means that wireless microphones may be necessary. Some of the higher-budget theater shows and musicals are mixed in surround sound live, often with the show's sound operator triggering sound effects that are being mixed with music and dialogue by the show's mixing engineer. These systems are usually much more extensive to design, typically involving separate sets of speakers for different zones in the theater.

=== Classical music and opera ===
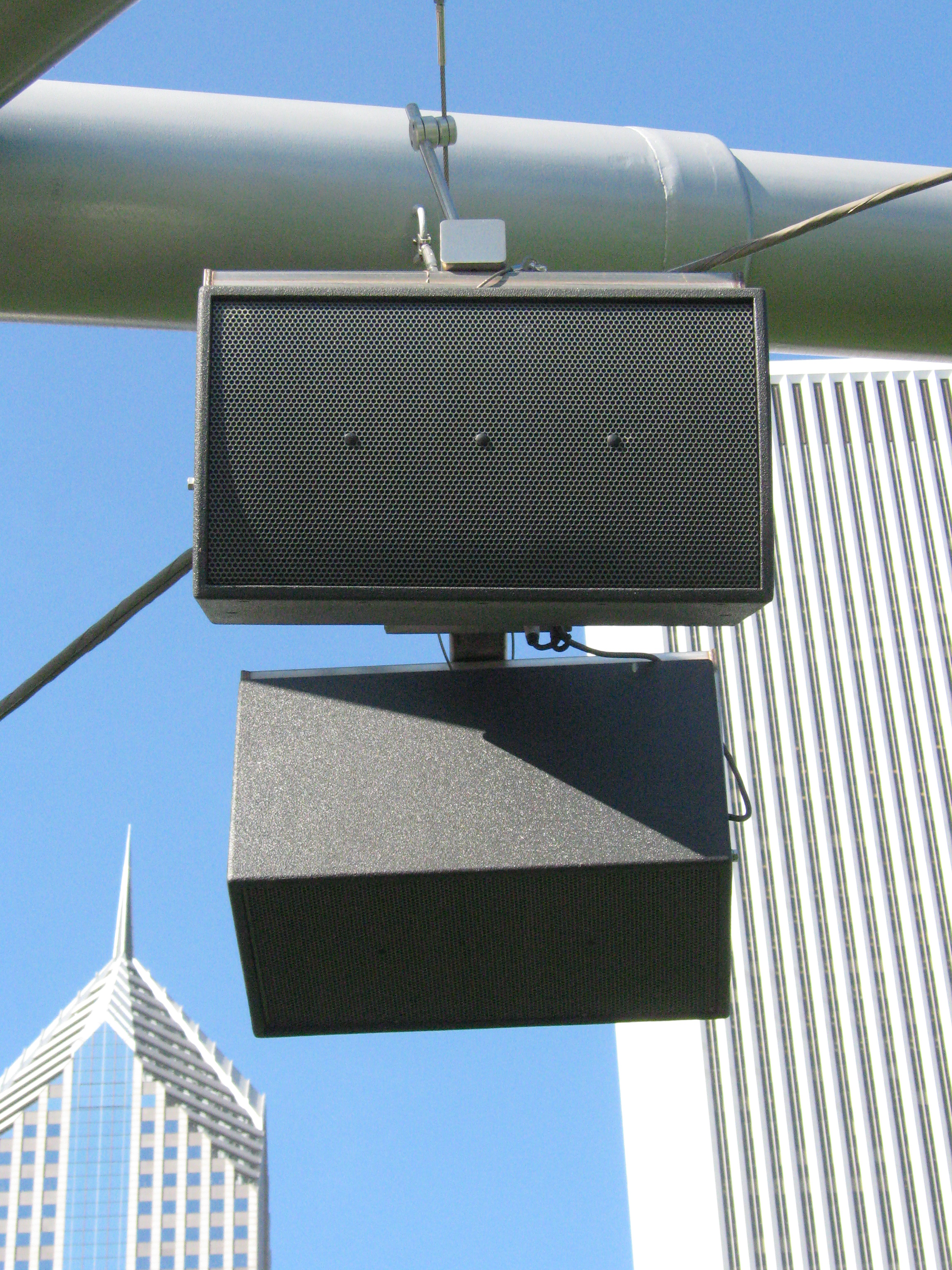
the first permanent LARES outdoor speakers at a concert venue named Jay Pritzker Pavilion

A subtle type of sound reinforcement called acoustic enhancement is used in some concert halls where classical music such as symphonies and opera is performed. Acoustic enhancement systems add more sound to the hall and prevent dead spots in the audience seating area by "...augment[ing] a hall's intrinsic acoustic characteristics. "The systems use "...an array of microphones connected to a computer [which is] connected to an array of loudspeakers. "However, as concertgoers have become aware of the use of these systems, debates have arisen, because "...purists maintain that the natural acoustic sound of [Classical] voices [or] instruments in a given hall should not be altered."

Kai Harada's article Opera's Dirty Little Secret states that opera houses have begun using electronic acoustic enhancement systems "...to compensate for flaws in a venue's acoustical architecture. "Despite the uproar that has arisen amongst operagoers, Harada points out that none of the opera houses using acoustic enhancement systems "...use traditional, Broadway-style sound reinforcement, in which most if not all singers are equipped with radio microphones mixed to a series of unsightly loudspeakers scattered throughout the theatre. "Instead, most opera houses use the sound reinforcement system for acoustic enhancement, and for subtle boosting of offstage voices, onstage dialogue, and sound effects (e.g., church bells in Tosca or thunder in Wagnerian operas).

These systems use microphones, computer processing "with delay, phase, and frequency-response changes", and then send the signal "... to a large number of loudspeakers placed in extremities of the performance venue. "Another acoustic enhancement system, VRAS uses "...different algorithms based on microphones placed around the room. "The Deutsche Staatsoper in Berlin and the Hummingbird Centre in Toronto use a LARES system. The Ahmanson Theatre in Los Angeles, the Royal National Theatre in London, and the Vivian Beaumont Theater in New York City use the SIAP system.

=== Lecture halls and conference rooms ===
Lecture halls and conference rooms pose the challenge of reproducing speech clearly in a large hall, which may have reflective, echo-producing surfaces. One issue with reproducing speech is that the microphone used to pick up the sound of an individual's voice may also pick up unwanted sounds, such as the rustling of papers on a podium. A more tightly directional microphone may help to reduce unwanted background noises.

Another challenge with doing live sound for individuals who are speaking at a conference is that, in comparison with professional singers, individuals who are invited to speak at a forum may not be familiar with how microphones work. Some individuals may accidentally point the microphone towards a speaker or monitor speaker, which may cause audio feedback.

In some conferences, sound engineers have to provide microphones for a large number of people who are speaking, in the case of a panel conference or debate. In some cases, automatic mixers are used to control the levels of the microphones and turn off the channels for microphones that are not being spoken into, to reduce unwanted background noise and reduce the likelihood of feedback.

=== Sports sound systems ===
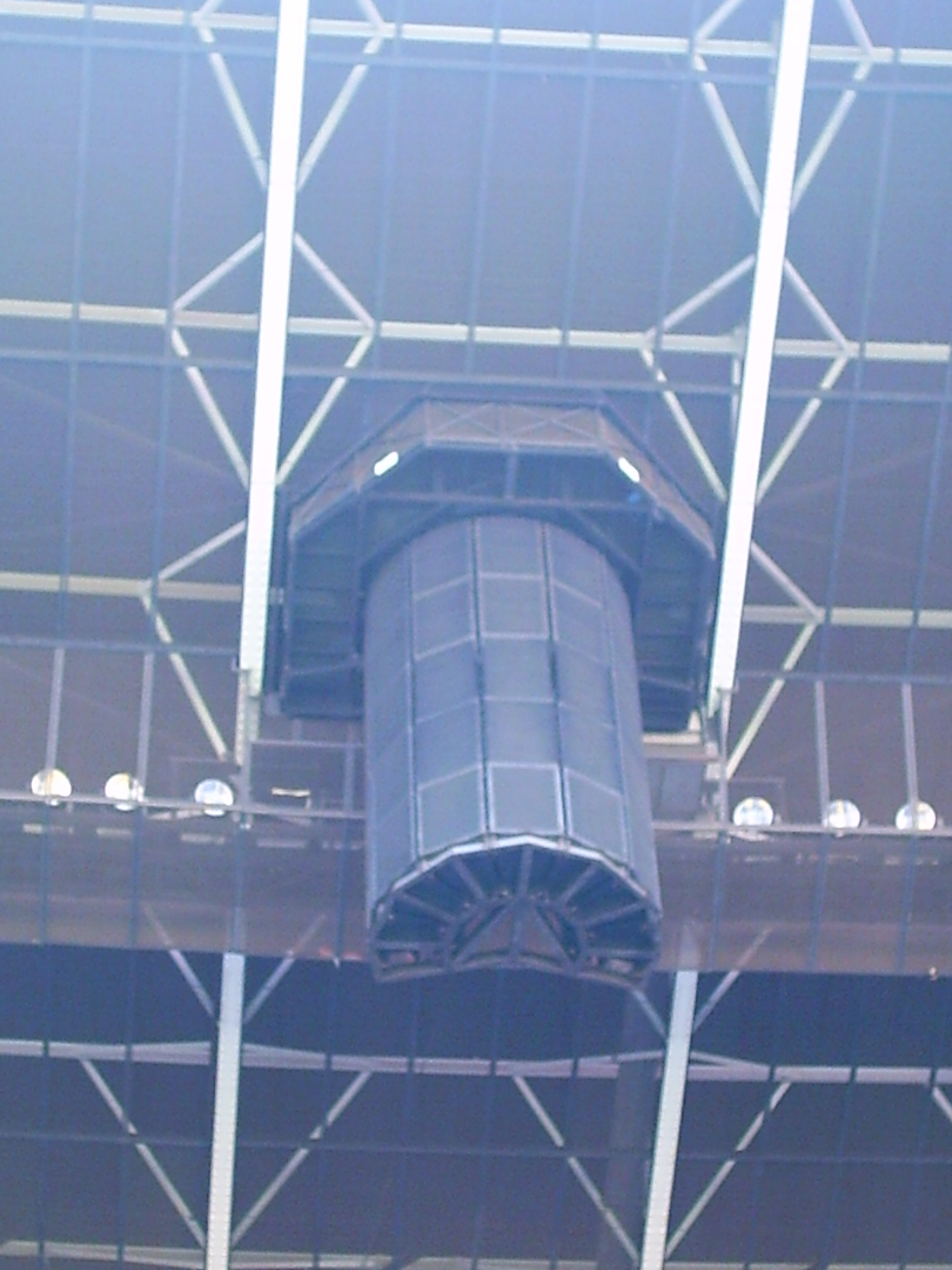
A speaker array mounted in the rafters in a camp sports facility.

Systems for sports facilities often have to deal with substantial echo, which can make speech unintelligible. Sports and recreational sound systems often face environmental challenges as well, such as the need for weather-proof outdoor speakers in outdoor stadiums and humidity- and splash-resistant speakers in swimming pools. Another challenge with sports sound reinforcement setups is that in many arenas and stadiums, the spectators are on all four sides of the playing field. This requires 360-degree sound coverage. This is very different from the norm with music festivals and music halls, where the musicians are on stage and the audience is seated in front of the stage.

=== Gain before feedback ===
The maximum level a sound reinforcement system can produce before the onset of acoustic feedback is its gain before feedback. Standard sound-system engineering practice compares the needed acoustic gain (NAG) required to make a talker audible throughout the audience with the potential acoustic gain (PAG) available from the system geometry; feedback begins as the closed-loop gain approaches unity. Because open microphones combine, each additional open microphone reduces the available gain: for a system with a number of open microphones (NOM) of equal sensitivity, the gain margin is reduced by approximately 10 log_{10}(NOM) decibels, so doubling the number of open microphones costs about 3 dB of gain before feedback.

== Setting up and testing ==
Large-scale sound reinforcement systems are designed, installed, and operated by audio engineers and audio technicians. During the design phase of a newly constructed venue, audio engineers work with architects and contractors, to ensure that the proposed design will accommodate the speakers and provide an appropriate space for sound technicians and the racks of audio equipment. Audio engineers will also provide advice on which audio components would best suit the space and its intended use, and on the correct placement and installation of these components. During the installation phase, audio engineers ensure that high-power electrical components are safely installed and connected and that ceiling or wall-mounted speakers are properly mounted (or "flown") onto rigging. When the sound reinforcement components are installed, the audio engineers test and calibrate the system so that its sound production will be even across the frequency spectrum.

=== System testing ===
A sound reinforcement system should be able to accurately reproduce a signal from its input, through any processing, to its output without any coloration or distortion. However, due to inconsistencies in venue sizes, shapes, building materials, and even crowd densities, this is not always possible without prior calibration of the system. This can be done in one of several ways.

The oldest method of system calibration involves a set of healthy ears, test program material (i.e. music or speech), a graphic equalizer, and a familiarity with the desired frequency response. One must then listen to the program material through the system, take note of any noticeable frequency deviation or resonances, and correct them using the equalizer. Engineers typically use a familiar playlist to calibrate a new system. This by ear process is still done by many engineers, even when analysis equipment is used, as a final check of how the system sounds with music or speech playing through the system. Another method of manual calibration requires a pair of high-quality headphones patched into the input signal before any processing. (Note: The pre-fade-listen feature on the test program input channel of the mixing console, or the headphone output of the CD player or tape deck can be used for this purpose.) One can then use this direct signal as a reference with which to identify any differences in frequency response.

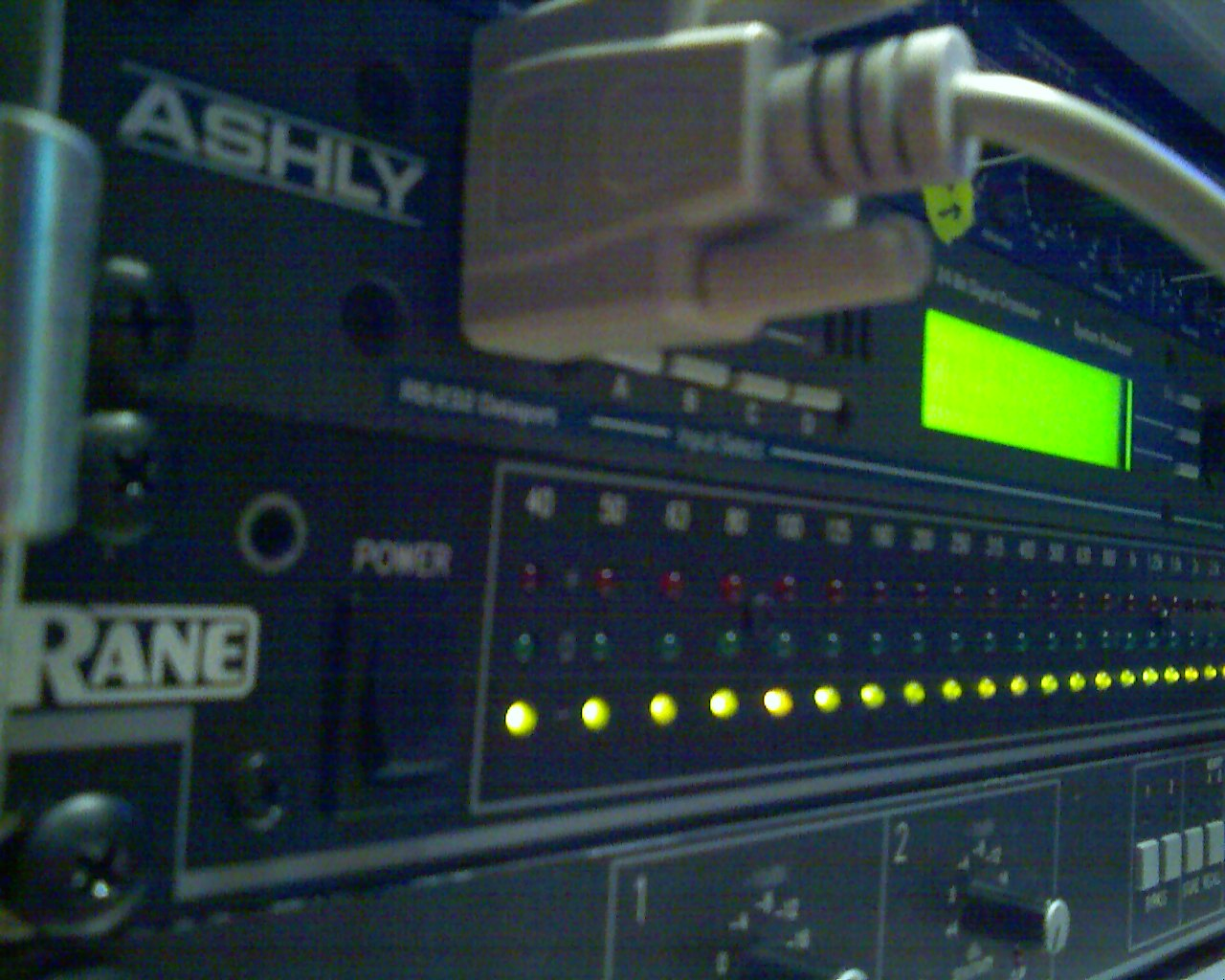
A Rane RA 27 hardware real-time analyzer underneath an Ashly Protea II 4.24C speaker processor (with RS-232 connection)

Since the development of digital signal processing (DSP), there have been many pieces of equipment and computer software designed to shift the bulk of the work of system calibration from human auditory interpretation to software algorithms that run on microprocessors. One tool for calibrating a sound system is a real-time analyzer (RTA). This tool is usually used by piping pink noise into the system and measuring the result with a special calibrated microphone connected to the RTA. Using this information, the system can be adjusted to help achieve the desired frequency response.

More recently, sound engineers have seen the introduction of dual fast-Fourier transform (FFT) based audio analysis software, such as Smaart, which allows an engineer to view not only frequency response information that an RTA provides, but also in the time domain. This provides the engineer with much more meaningful data than an RTA alone. Dual FFT analysis allows one to compare the source signal with the output signal. A system can be calibrated using normal program material instead of pink noise or other special test signals. Calibration can be monitored during a performance.

== Equipment supply stores ==
Professional audio stores sell microphones, speaker enclosures, monitor speakers, mixing boards, rack-mounted effects units and related equipment designed for use by audio engineers and technicians. Stores often use the word professional or pro in their name or the description of their store, to differentiate their stores from consumer electronics stores, which sell consumer-grade loudspeakers, home cinema equipment, and amplifiers, which are designed for private, in-home use.
