= Music store =

Retail business that sells musical instruments, related equipment and accessories

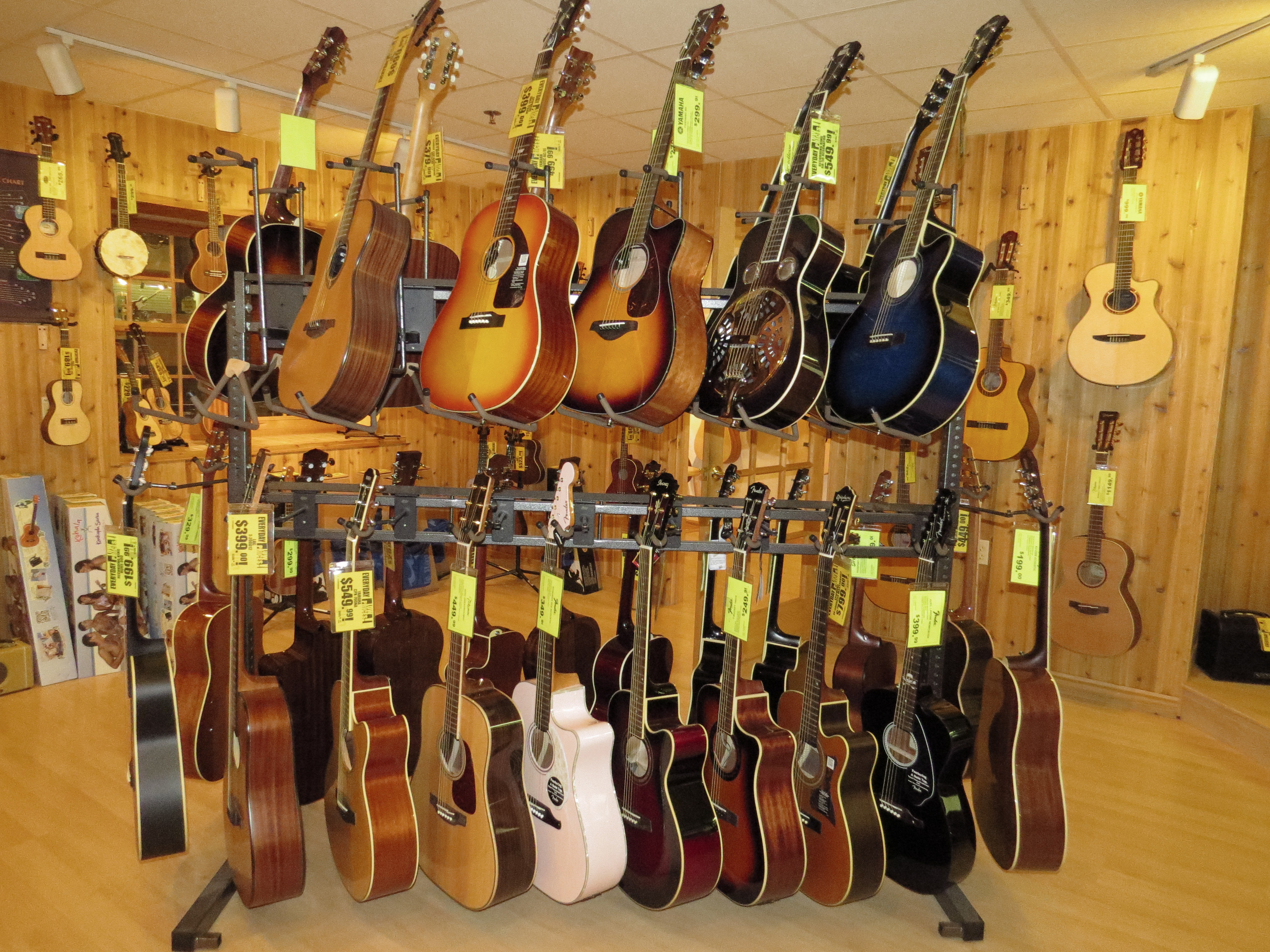
Cascio Interstate Music SuperStore Acoustic Guitar Cabin

A music store or musical instrument store is a retail business that sells musical instruments and related equipment and accessories. Some music stores sell additional services, such as music lessons, music instrument or equipment rental, or repair services.

== Products ==
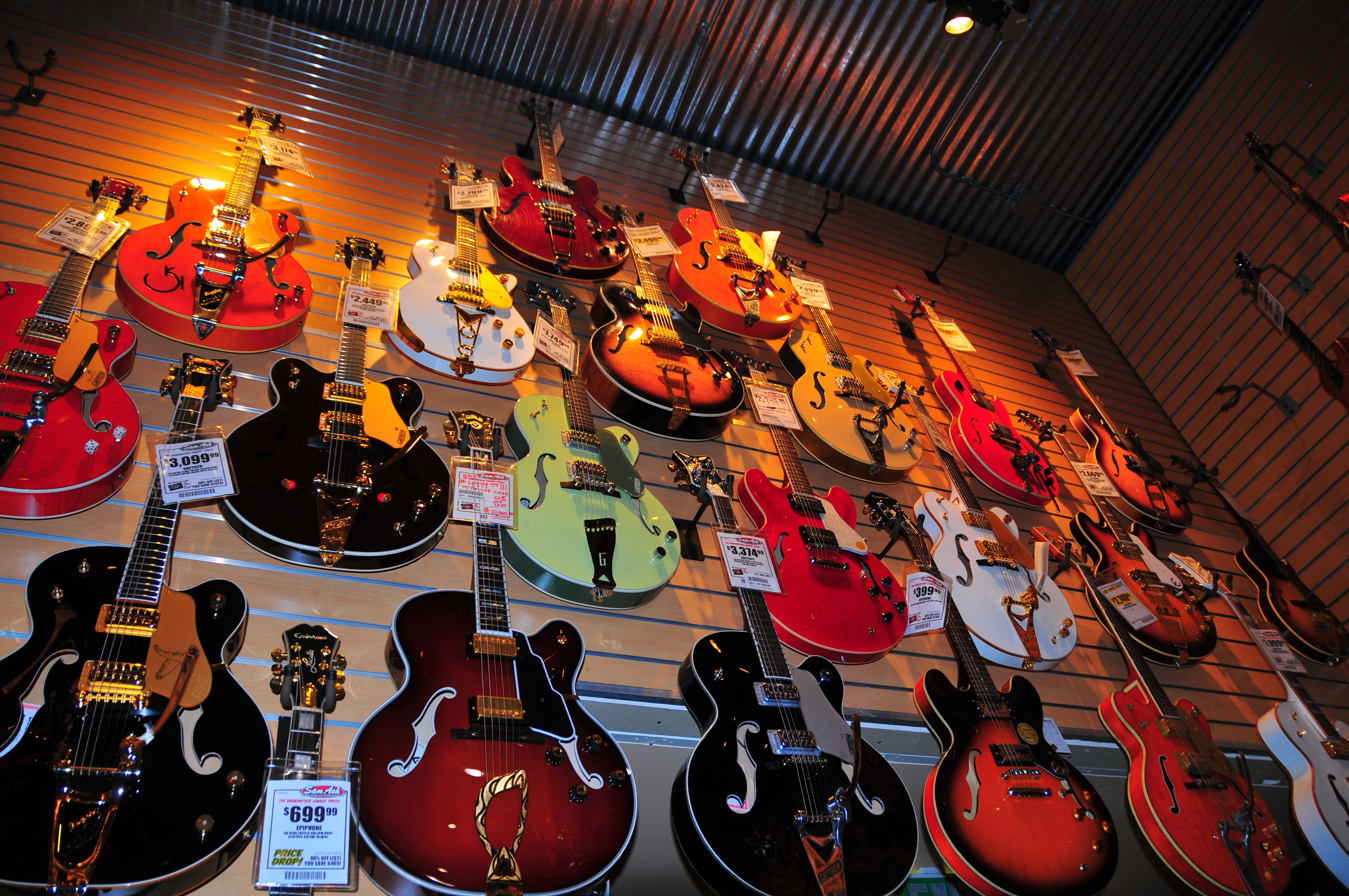
A selection of electric guitars at Sam Ash Music in Hollywood, California.

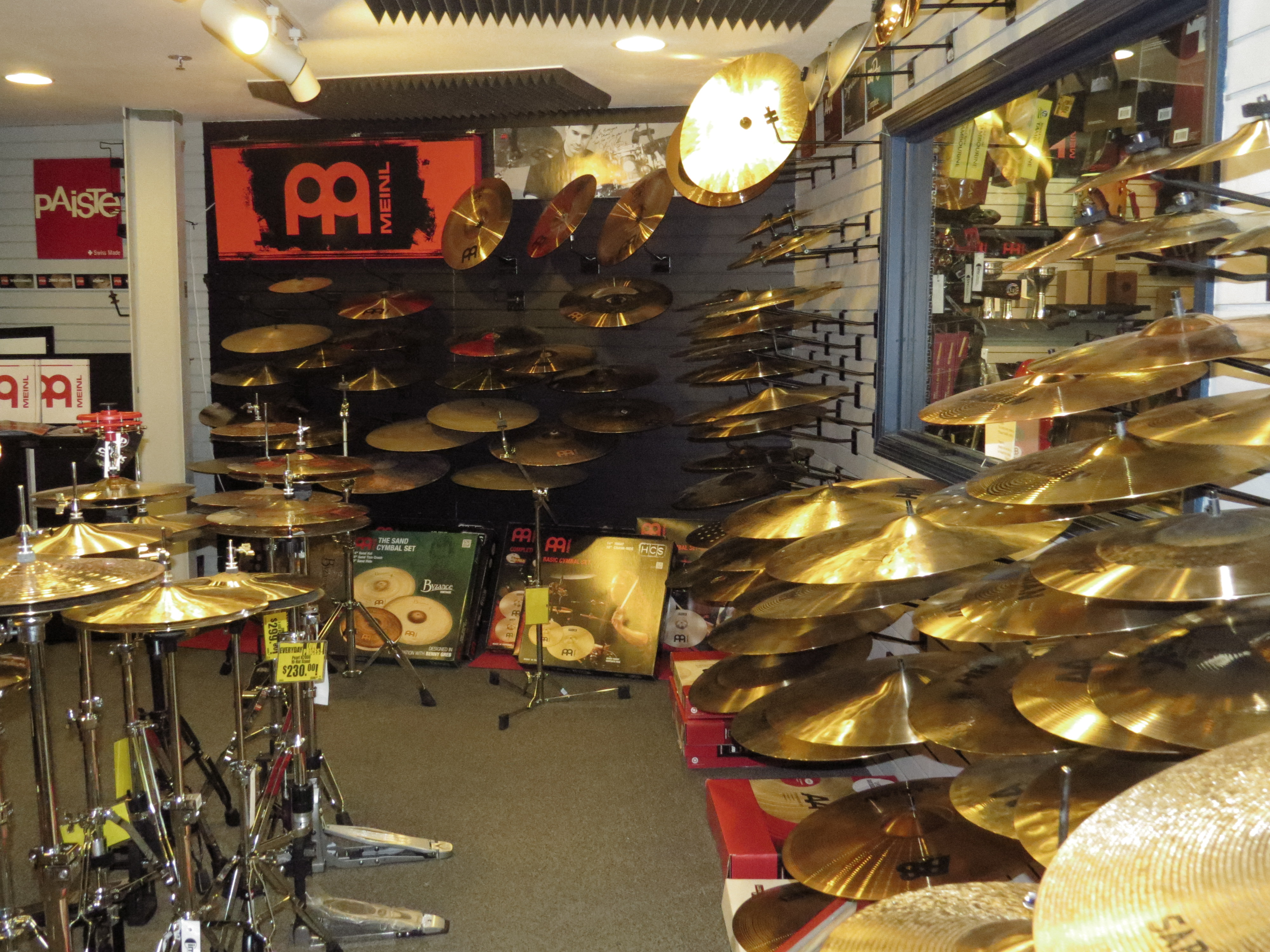
A cymbal room in a music store.

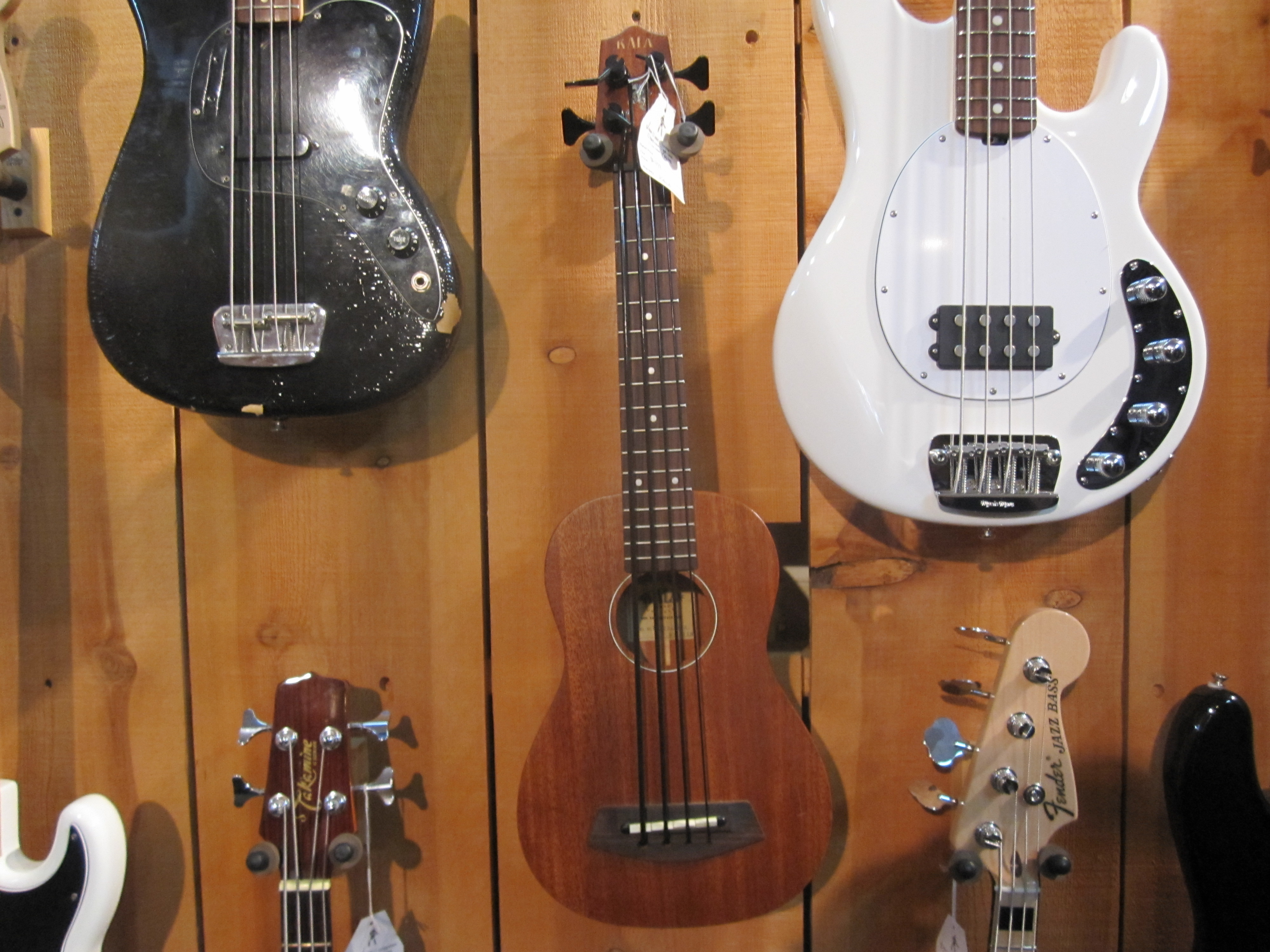
A selection of electric basses at a music store in Louisville, Kentucky.

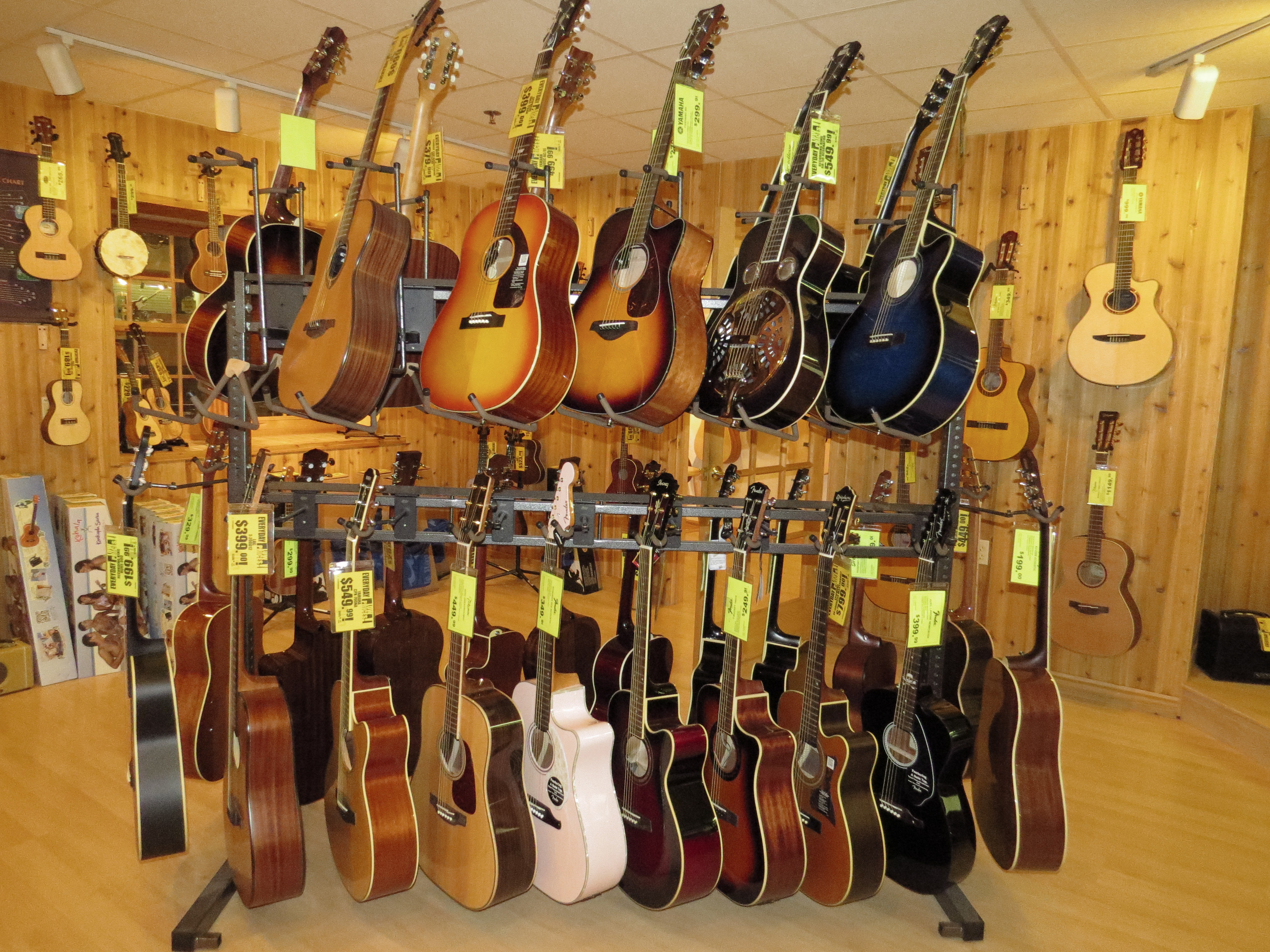
A selection of acoustic guitars at Cascio Interstate Music SuperStore.

Music stores range from full-line stores that sell products across all musical instrument and even pro audio categories (sometimes including DJ equipment and visual stage components such as lights or fog machines), to music stores that focus on a subset of those categories (e.g. a store that sells acoustic and digital pianos, or a store that specializes only in drums and percussion), to highly-specialized stores focused on a single product type (e.g. a guitar boutique focused on vintage collectible guitars, or a sheet music store). In the United States and Canada, another common distinction exists between “Band and Orchestra” stores that cater to the needs of school music programs and their students, versus “Combo” stores that focus on instruments and equipment used by a rock band.

Music stores arose to service the needs of the local community. This included not only individual amateur musicians, but schools from elementary to college level, civic bands and orchestras, churches, and entertainment ensembles that performed at events of the community and its organizations. In service of this diverse clientele, store owners might focus on some specialty or niche market (pianos, sheet music, percussion). Instruments might be purchased outright, leased or rented. Specific or non-stock items could be ordered through the store.

More commonly, music stores offered some variety, depending upon the tastes and resources of the owners and the desires of their clientele (whether actual or sought after). This might include some mixture of fretted instruments (electric guitars, acoustic guitars, mandolins, ukuleles); brass, woodwind, and violin-family instruments; drums and percussion; pianos and organs; consumable items (strings, reeds, drum sticks); accessories (metronomes, music stands); and sheet music.

In more recent decades, stores began to include instrument amplifiers, guitar effects units, electronic keyboards, microphones, sound recording equipment and digital audio software. Recorded musical instruction became a niche, beginning with LPs and evolving through formats of cassette tape, VHS video, compact disk, and DVD.

Some music stores provided instrument maintenance and repair, music lessons, or leasing of instruments and equipment.

== Specialized stores ==
In the 2010s, general music stores have had to face competition from online music stores, which offer a huge selection of instruments and equipment.

=== Electric guitars ===
Electric guitars started appearing in the 1930s. Mainstream electric guitars stores sell well-known brands like Gibson, Fender and Ibanez. Most guitar stores sell six-string models, bass guitars, left handed guitars and electric guitar packages for beginners, which typically include a budget-priced electric guitar, a small practice amplifier, a strap and picks.

Guitar World magazine states that since guitar stores require patrons to try out guitars and amplifiers in the premises, some guitar players are nervous about playing in front of the store staff and other patrons. A University Press of Kentucky book on women in music states that customers did not treat a woman who worked at a guitar store like she knew anything about guitars until she would use special guitar terms.

=== Acoustic guitars ===
Acoustic guitar sections are one of the main areas in many music stores. Some stores create a separate area with a door, both to create a quieter area for customers to play the instruments and to enable humidifiers to be used. Famous acoustic guitars include C. F. Martin & Company, Taylor Guitars, Fender, Gibson, Guild, Washburn and Lowden Guitars.

=== Piano ===
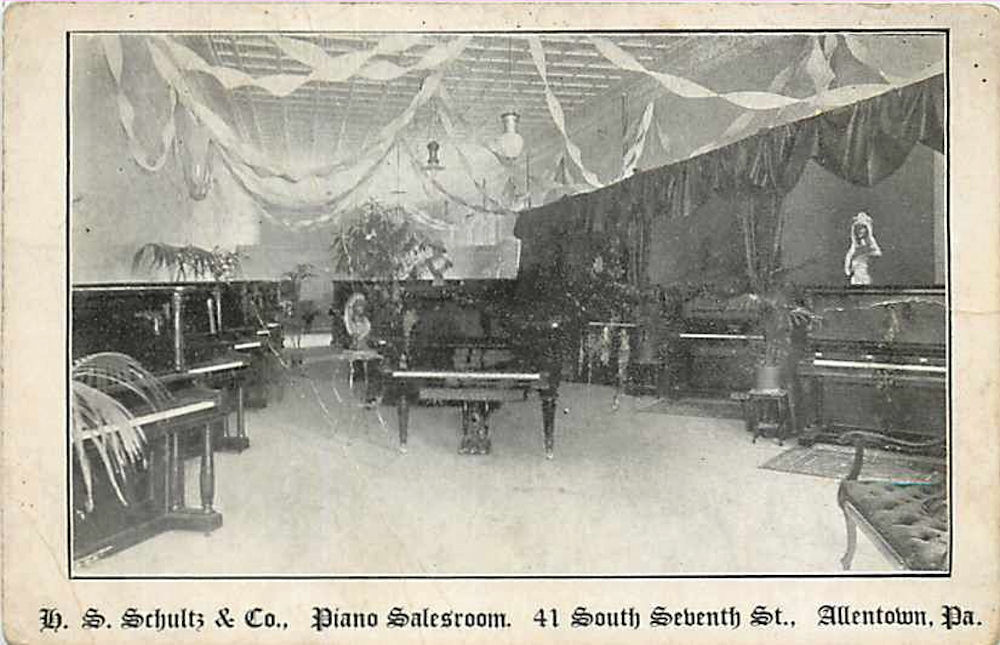
The H.S. Schultz Piano Store in 1905.

One common specialty store is the piano store, which typically sells a range of upright pianos and grand pianos. In the 2010s, some piano stores sell high-end digital pianos, including grand pianos equipped with a digital player piano mechanism that can play back a recorded performance by activating the hammers. Piano sales are on the decline, in part because high-quality, properly-maintained pianos can remain playable for 60 to 80 years after their original purchase. Some piano stores offer rental of new pianos; as well, some piano stores sell used pianos. In addition, digital alternatives have also become more affordable and accessible, prompting many consumers to opt for electronic keyboards with built-in recording or MIDI capabilities.

The high price of pianos is one factor that is causing the closing of piano stores: "A good grand piano from a respected name costs about as much as a luxury automobile", and as such, children (and their parents) are choosing less expensive instruments, such as electronic keyboards or stringed instruments.

Though sales of acoustic pianos and quality keyboard instruments continually declines in the United States, in China "piano sales are booming", with most instruments being intended for home use. This rise in sales is in part because the costly instruments are viewed as a status symbol in China.

=== Violin family ===
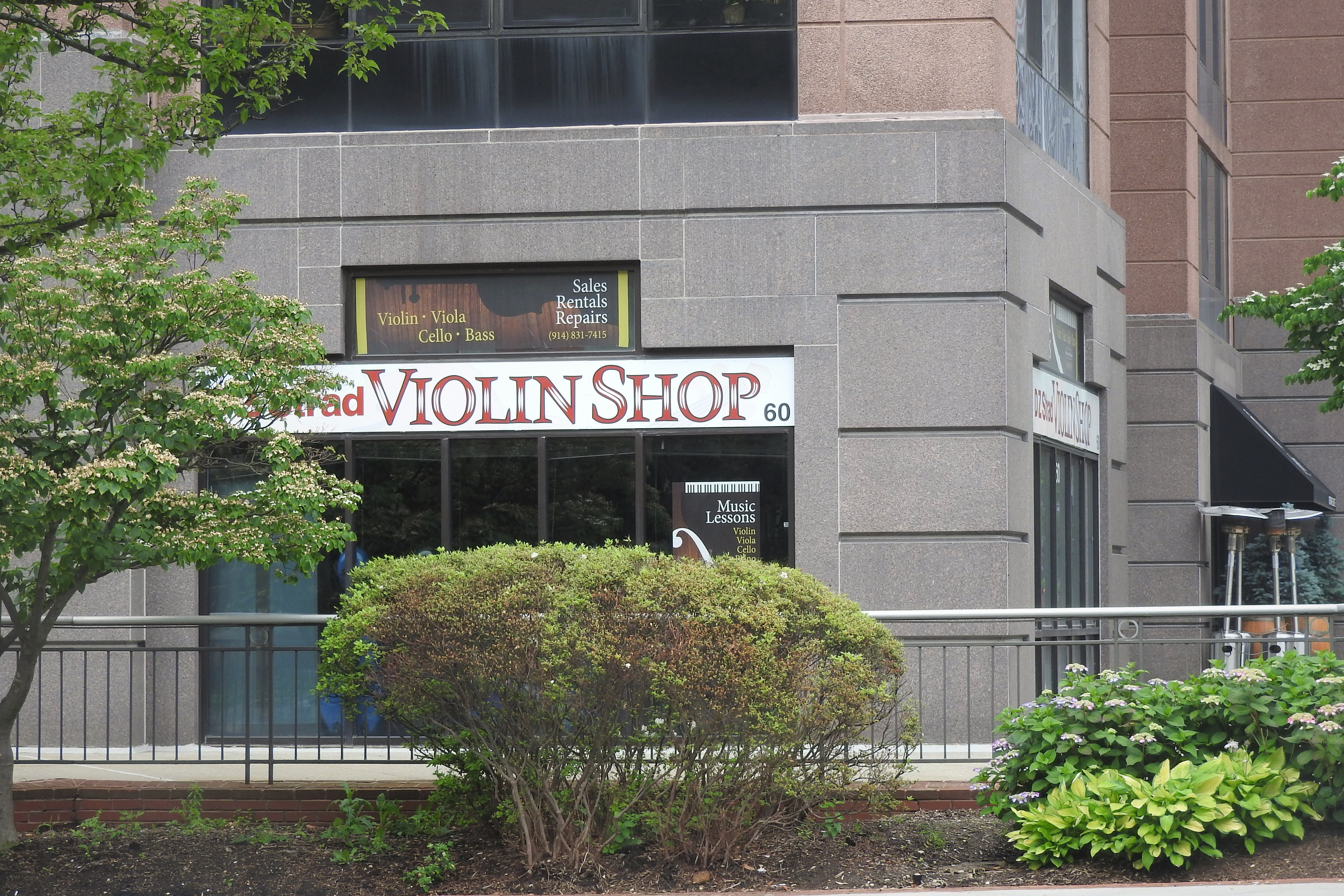
Violin shop in White Plains, New York

Another specialty shop is the "violin shop", which, despite its name, often sells various violin family instruments (violin, viola, cello and often double bass, and the bows, strings, rosin, chinrests, and other accessories used with these instruments). Violin shops are often operated by luthiers (violinmakers) who make violin family instruments and bows for sale. Luthiers also do maintenance and repairs on violin family instruments and bows.

=== Sheet music ===
Sheet music stores sell printed classical music for songs, instrumental solo pieces, chamber music, and scores for major symphonies and choral works, along with instrumental method books, "etudes" (studies) and graded musical exercises. Many sheet music stores also carry printed music songs for popular music genres such as rock, pop and musical theatre including individual songs and collections of songs grouped by artist, musical, or genre. Music for guitarists or electric bass players may be in tabulature notation, which depicts where on the instrument the performer should play a line. In the 2010s, sheet music stores often sell legal, copyright-compliant jazz fake books. Sheet music stores often carry some practice accessories, such as metronomes, music stands and tuning forks.

=== Pro audio ===
Pro audio stores sell and in many cases, rent sound reinforcement system components, PA systems, microphones and other audio gear. Some stores also rent "backline" musical gear, such as stage pianos and bass amps.

=== Organ stores ===
Prior to the widespread availability of lightweight electronic clonewheel organs in the 1980s and 1990s that emulate the sound of a heavy, electromechanical Hammond organ, many cities had organ stores which sold large electric and electronic theatre organs and spinet organs made by Hammond, Lowrey and other manufacturers. These organs were sold for use in private homes and in churches; electric and electronic organs were popular for churches, because they cost significantly less than a pipe organ.

== Used stores ==
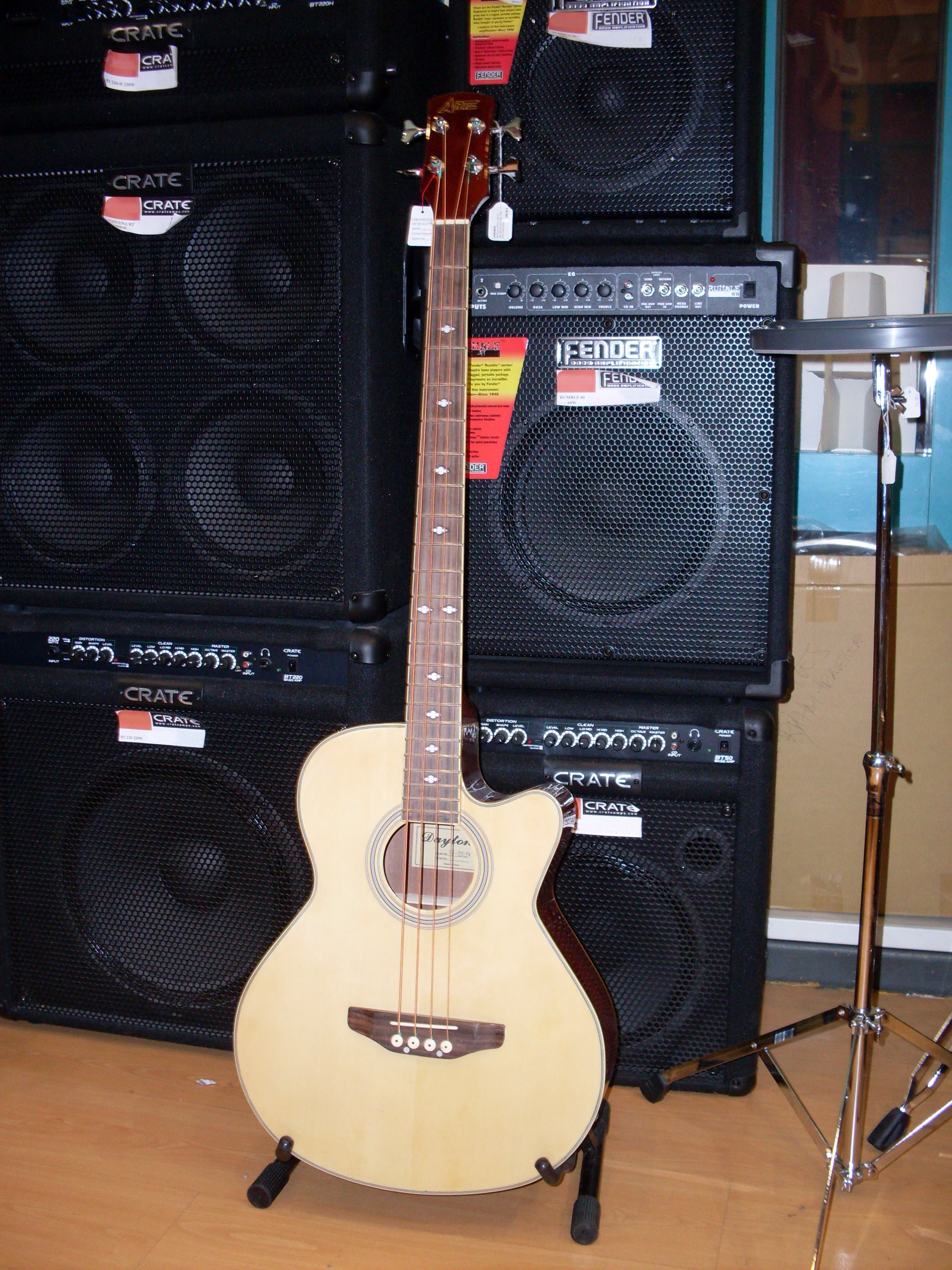
A music store display showing an acoustic bass guitar and a variety of bass "combo" amplifiers and speaker cabinets.

Music stores may sell used, possibly vintage or collectible instruments and sound gear.

Used-gear stores may employ or offer a consignment model, in which the store (acting as the consignee) sells the piece on behalf of the actual owner (the consignor) and takes a portion of the purchase price. Some stores also operate trade-in functions, allowing customers to exchange older gear for store credit or discounts on new items.

Stores that primarily sell used equipment may carry new merchandise, minimally guitar strings, patch cords and microphone cables. In the United States, nationwide chains such as Music Go Round (about 30% new gear) and Sam Ash Music carry on a steady trade of used instruments and equipment.

Online marketplaces such as eBay and Vinted have expanded access to secondhand musical instruments, enabling peer-to-peer resale at scale. In response, several major music retailers have introduced resale programs that incorporate logistics, inspection, and fulfilment services. For example, Sweetwater operates a gear exchange program that allows customers to sell or trade used instruments for cash or store credit. In the UK & Europe, retailers such as Gear4music also offer secondhand platforms that enable users to buy and sell used instruments online.

== Online stores ==
Since the 2000s, many music retailers have begun to adopt an online model. Retailers sell instruments and sound gear through websites that contain photos of the equipment, which are grouped into categories (e.g., electric guitars, amplifiers, PA gear). Each photo of a product is accompanied by the name and model number of each item, a description of each product's features, and the price. The sophistication of online music stores varies. Some online music stores have a single photo of the item, the product name and price, and a few bullets about the features. On the other hand, some online music stores have interactive Web 2.0 features, such as 360-degree virtual reality-style images of the products, in which the viewer can "turn" the product around to see the back and sides, online comments sections where customers can review their purchases and additional music-related content, such as articles on musical instruments or sound gear written by store staff. Patrons pay electronically at online music stores using a credit card, PayPal or other electronic payment systems. The goods are shipped through the mail or by express delivery companies such as FedEx. Some music stores sell their products solely online. In other cases, some stores operate both a "brick and mortar" store (or chain) and an online store.
