= Professional audio store =

Retail business

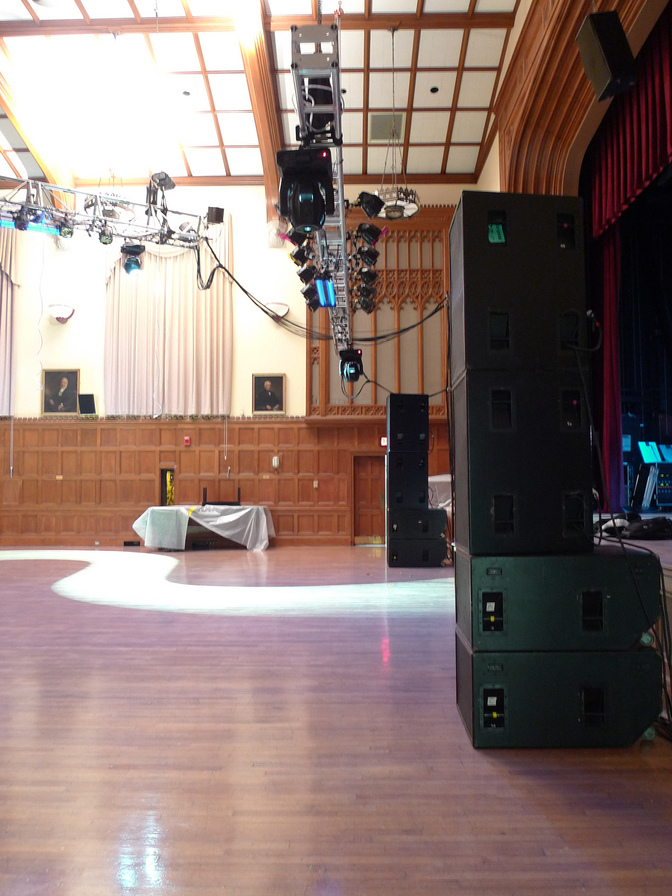
This photo illustrates some of the professional sound reinforcement system equipment which is sold or rented at pro audio stores. Each stack of speakers in this setup consists of two EAW SB1000 slanted baffle subwoofers (each contains two 18" drivers) and two EAW KF850 full-range cabinets for the mid and high frequencies.

A professional audio store is a retail business that sells, and in many cases rents, sound reinforcement system equipment and PA system components used in music concerts, live shows, dance parties and speaking events. This equipment typically includes microphones, power amplifiers, electronic effects units (e.g., reverb and compression effects), speaker enclosures, monitor speakers, subwoofers and audio consoles (mixers). Some professional audio stores also sell sound recording equipment, DJ equipment, lighting equipment used in nightclubs and concerts and video equipment used in events, such as video projectors and screens. Some professional audio stores rent "backline" equipment used in rock and pop shows, such as stage pianos and bass amplifiers. While professional audio stores typically focus on selling new merchandise, some stores also sell used equipment, which is often the equipment that the company has previously rented out for shows and events.

== Terminology ==
Professional audio stores are also called "pro audio stores", "pro sound stores", "sound reinforcement" companies, "PA system companies" or "audio-visual companies", with the latter name being used when a store supplies a significant amount of video equipment for events, such as video projectors and screens. Stores often use the word "professional" in their name or the description of their store, to differentiate their stores from consumer electronics stores, which sell consumer-grade loudspeakers, home cinema equipment, and amplifiers, which are designed for private, in-home use.

== Products ==
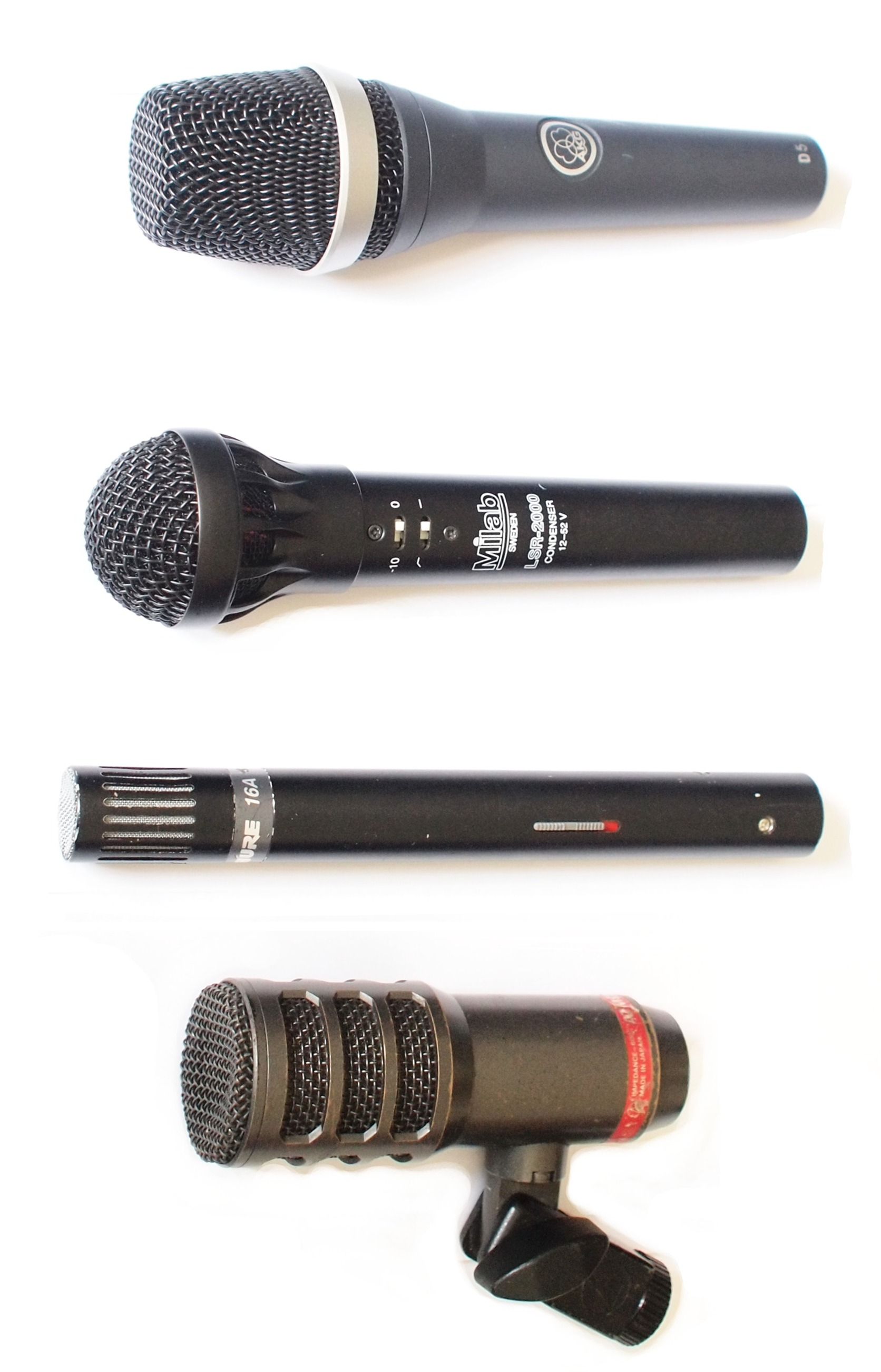
Pro audio stores carry a range of microphones that can be used for different live sound and recording applications.

Pro audio stores carry a range of microphones used in live sound and recording, including specialized mics such as drum mics. Stores typically carry wireless systems which enable microphones and electric instruments to be played without cables. Recording gear includes audio interfaces, studio monitors, audio recorders, studio subwoofers, analog-digital and digital-analog converters, studio power amplifiers and duplication equipment. Live sound equipment includes sound reinforcement system loudspeaker enclosures, loudspeakers, monitor speakers, power amplifiers and subwoofers. Headphone equipment includes studio and DJ headphones, headphone amplifiers and headphone mixers. Audio consoles include live sound mixers, powered mixers (which have a built-in power amplifier), unpowered mixers and digital mixers. Signal processing gear includes DI boxes, crossovers and a range a of electronic effects, which are typically rackmountable units, including: microphone preamplifiers, electronic vocal processors, exciters, equalizers, compressors and limiters, feedback suppressors and noise gates. Some stores also sell audio software, such as DAW software, signal processing software and virtual instruments.

== Other products ==
While some pro audio stores only sell audio equipment, others also sell products in other categories that are used in rock concerts and DJ events, such as portable stages, stage lights, par cans and light stands. Some stores sell coloured lights, lasers and strobe lights which flash, change colours and/or move according to the beat of the music; these lights are used in nightclubs and rave dance events. Some stores also sell fog machines, which are used in dances, concerts and theatre productions, often to enhance the appearance of the lighting and laser effects. Some pro audio stores sell a range of DJ equipment, such as direct drive turntables, record cartridges and styli, DJ CD players and DJ mixers.

== Other services ==
Some professional audio stores sell the services of audio engineers, audio technicians and delivery personnel who can deliver and set up professional sound equipment and/or oversee the audio mixing of the different instruments and voices during a show or event. Some professional audio stores offer paid consulting services on professional audio issues. These consultants can come to a customer's venue, which may be a nightclub, church, conference center, auditorium or stadium, assess its professional audio needs, and recommend the types of components–speaker enclosures, mixing boards, microphone types, and so on–that would best suit this venue and the customer's budget.

== See also ==
- Music stores (these stores primarily sell musical instruments and instrument amplifiers, but most also sell some sound reinforcement system equipment)
- Pawnshops (these stores often sell some used professional audio gear such as PA speakers and power amplifiers)
