= Real-time analyzer =

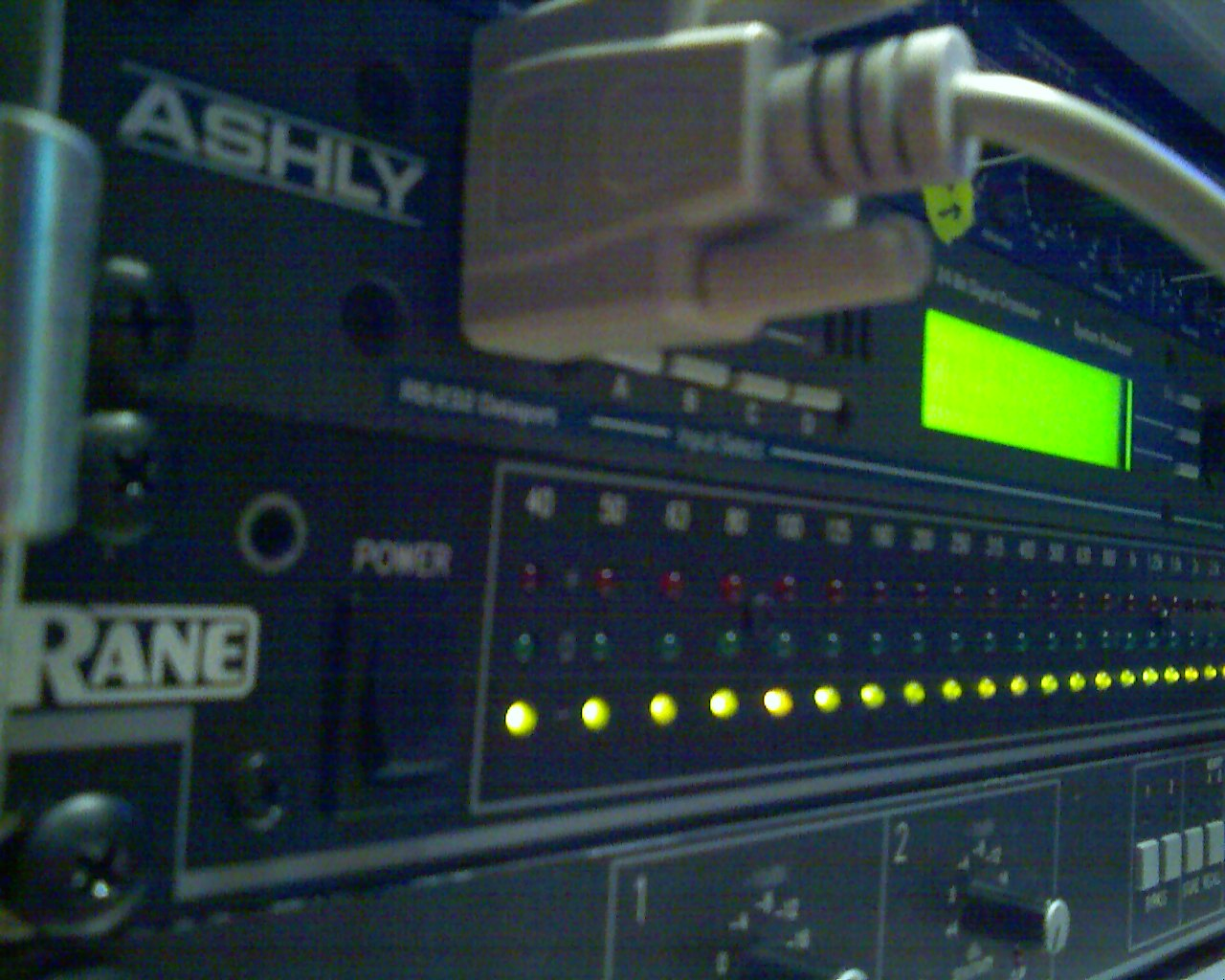
Rane RA 27 hardware real-time analyzer underneath an Ashly Protea II 4.24C speaker processor (with RS-232 connection)

A real-time analyzer (RTA) is a professional audio device that measures and displays the frequency spectrum of an audio signal; a spectrum analyzer that works in real time. An RTA can range from a small PDA-sized device to a rack-mounted hardware unit to software running on a laptop. It works by measuring and displaying sound input, often from an integrated microphone or with a signal from a PA system. Basic RTAs show three measurements per octave at 3 or 6 dB increments; sophisticated software solutions can show 24 or more measurements per octave as well as 0.1 dB resolution.

== Types ==
RTA display employing digital signal processing (DSP)

There are generally two types of RTAs:

1. RTAs employing analog signal processing, and
2. RTAs employing digital signal processing (DSP).

The main difference between the two types is that the analog RTAs use a series of hardwired, analog bandpass filters to break the signal into frequency bands prior to measuring it. Digital RTAs use digital sampling technology and microprocessor-based digital signal processing to perform necessary calculations, such as fast Fourier transforms, to perform the measurements and thus do not need analog hardware filters to isolate each frequency band. The digital approach to signal analysis generally yields much higher accuracy and resolution and thus most RTAs currently in production use digital signal processing technology. Digital signal processing is more cost effective.

=== Professional use ===
RTAs are often used by sound engineers and by acousticians installing audio systems in all kinds of listening spaces: Venues, home theatres, cars, etc. The parameters that can be measured are the spectral aspects of sound reproduction caused by effects like resonances and constructive and destructive interference, but not imaging and spatial aspects. In professional audio, many systems incorporate an RTA along with a device that also performs equalization. While measuring pink noise or other test tones, such a controller can level out the frequency response by employing a set of adjustments in the appropriate frequency areas according to the system's interaction with the venue's size, shape and construction materials, among other things.

== See also ==
- Architectural acoustics
- Audio signal processing
- Auditory scene analysis including 3D-sound perception, localization
- Real-time computing
- Signal separation
- Sound localization
- Spectrum analyzer
- Timbre
