= Orthodox seed =

Seed which may be preserved via drying or freezing

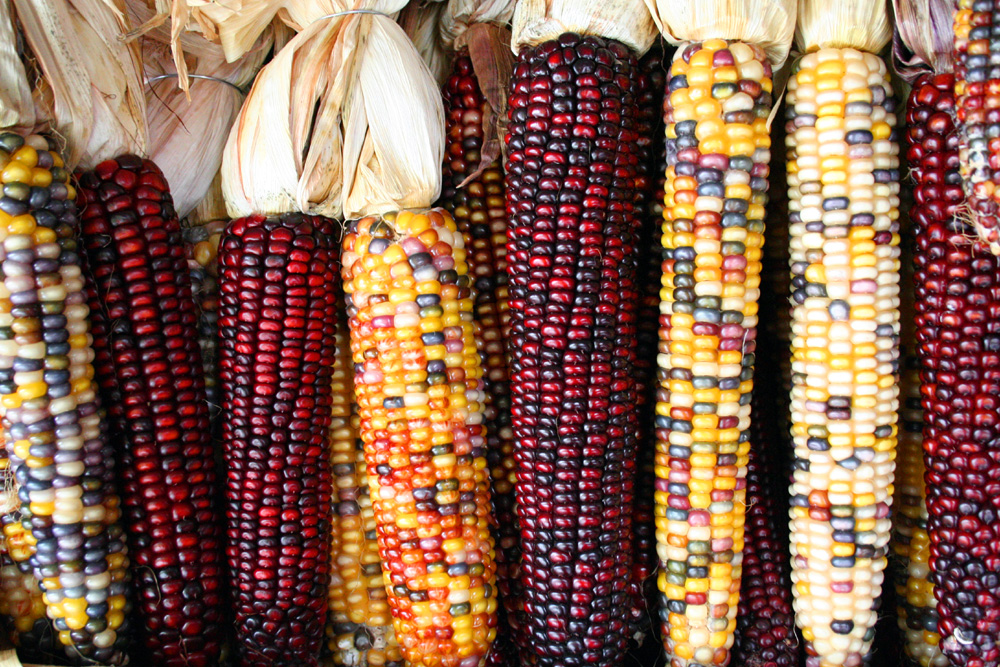
Zea maize, a widely grown orthodox seed which may be dried for two years without harm

Orthodox seeds are seeds which will survive drying and/or freezing during ex situ conservation, as opposed to recalcitrant seeds, which will not. According to information from the U.S. Department of Agriculture, there is variation in the ability of orthodox seeds to withstand drying and storage, with some seeds being more sensitive than others. Thus some seeds are considered intermediate in their storage capability while others are fully orthodox. One notable example of a long-lived orthodox seed which survived accidental storage followed by controlled germination is the case of the 2,000-year-old Judean date palm (cultivar of Phoenix dactylifera) seed which successfully sprouted in 2005. This particular seed is reputed to be the oldest viable seed, but the upper survival time limit of properly stored seeds remains unknown.

== See also ==
- Micropropagation
- Plant propagation
- Seedbank
