= List of resurrected species =

List of organisms that have been revived or recreated in modern times

This is a list of resurrected species. A previously extinct or lost species can be "revived" or recreated through various methods such as cloning, backbreeding, genome editing, thawing, and seed germination in plants.

== Plants ==
=== Seed germination ===
==== York groundsel ====
The York groundsel is a species of Senecio that was first discovered in York, England in 1979 and last seen in the wild in 1991. A survey by UK government advisory body Natural England found it was driven to extinction by 2000, partly due to the use of weedkiller. Seeds of the plant were stored at the Millennium Seed Bank, successfully germinated, and reintroduced to York in 2023, marking the first time an extinct species has been revived and successfully reintroduced into its native range.

==== Judean date palm ====
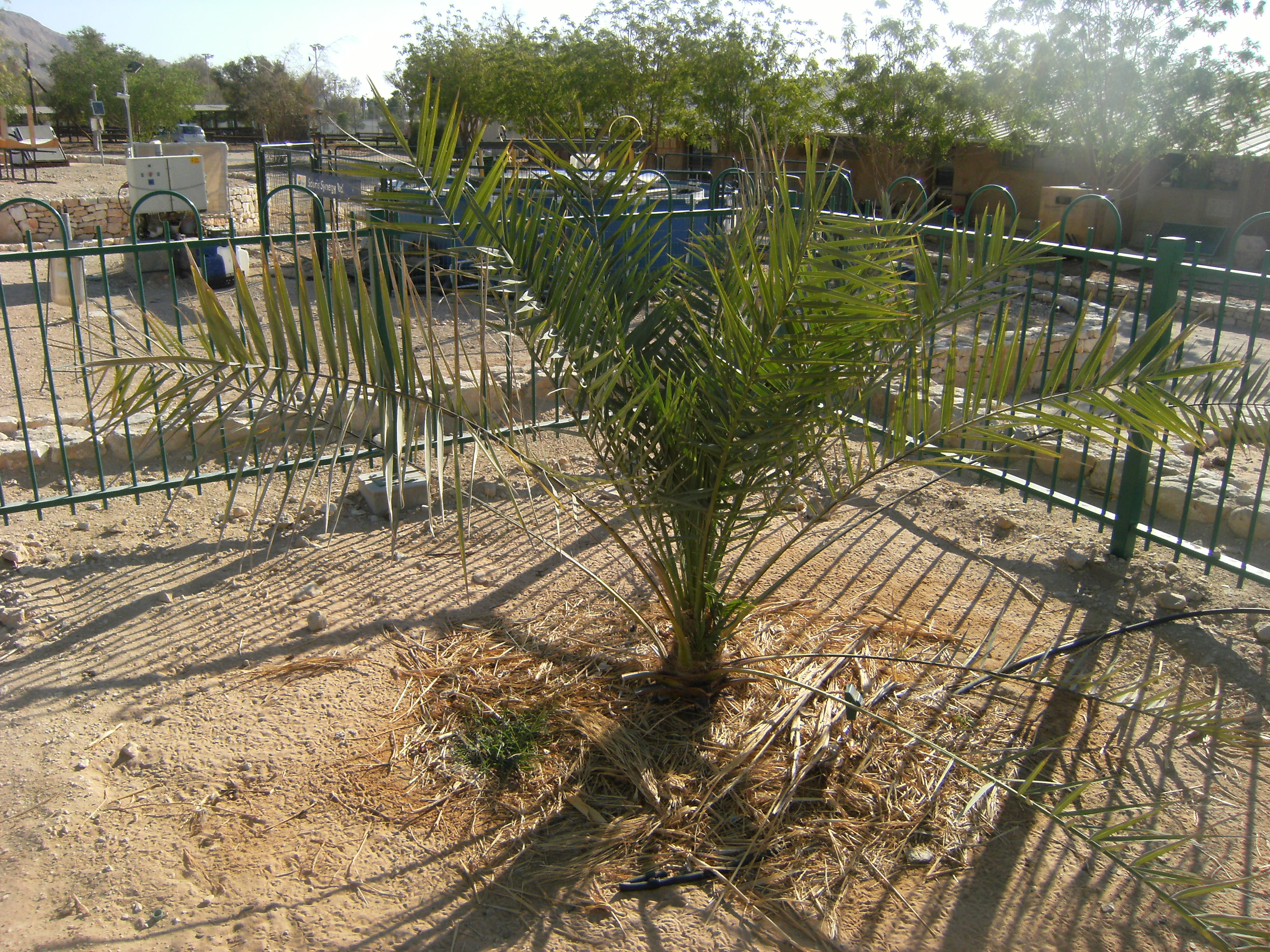
Methuselah, a revived Judean date palm

The Judean date palm is a cultivar of the date palm (Phoenix dactylifera) that is historically endemic to ancient Judea (modern-day Israel and Palestine). It is genetically unique, and closely related to modern Iraqi and Moroccan varieties. Between 1963 and 1991, archaeologists discovered Judean date seeds in excavation sites. Through radiocarbon dating, they were determined to be between 1,900 and 2,300 years old. In 2008, researchers at the Arava Institute for Environmental Studies began to germinate the seeds.

As of 2023, seven Judean date palms have successfully germinated. In 2020, researchers began to harvest dates from these trees. Experiments to revive this cultivar are ongoing.

==== Montreal melon ====
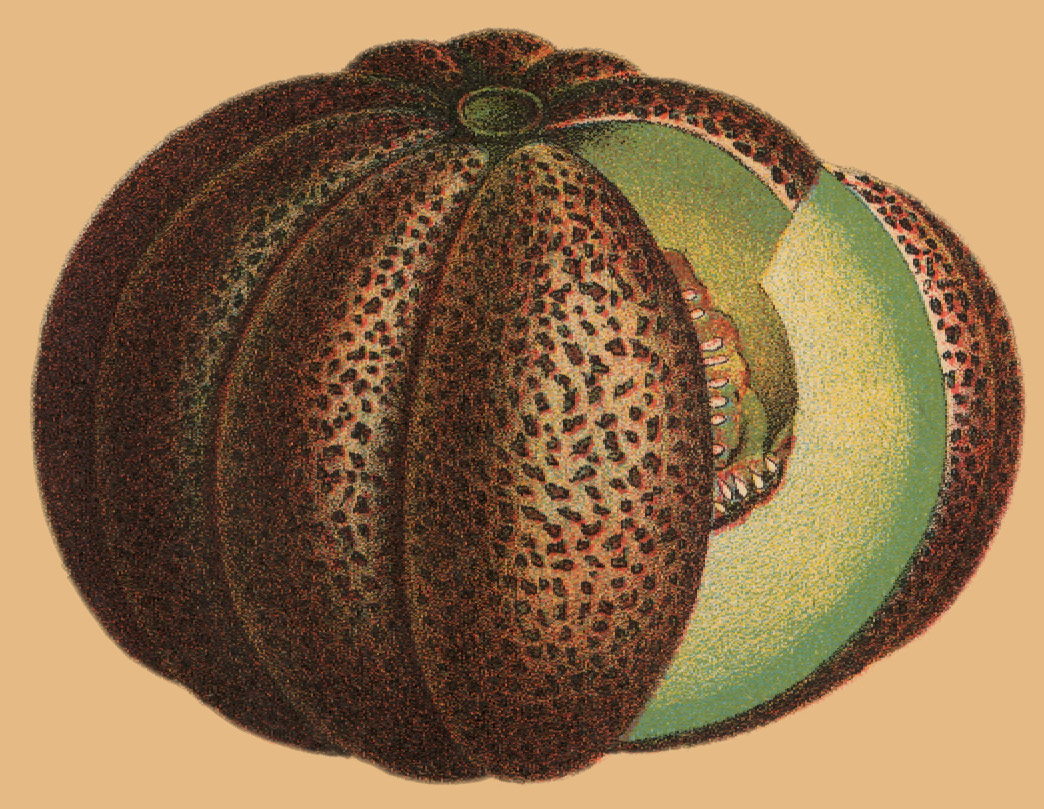
The Montreal melon

The Montreal melon, also known as the Montreal market muskmelon, Montreal nutmeg melon, and melon de Montréal (Melon of/from Montreal) in French is a commercial cultivar of melon native to Canada. It was traditionally grown around the Montreal area, hence its namesake. The fruit was known for being the largest melon in North America during its initial cultivation. It disappeared entirely from family farms and cultivation in the region by the 1920s due to industrialisation in Canada and being ill-suited for agribusiness. In 1997, seeds of the melon were discovered in a seed bank in the American state of Iowa. Since then, the Montreal melon has been reintroduced to its former range by local gardeners.

==== Unknown Commiphora ====
In September 2024, a specimen of a never-before-seen Commiphora by the name of Sheba reached maturity. In the 1980s, Sheba was found in excavations of a cave in the Judean desert as seed but was not germinated until recent times. Sheba is estimated to be over 1000 years old through radiocarbon dating, and researchers suspect that Sheba may be the tsori or Judean balsam, two plants stated to have healing properties in the Bible.

==== Cylindrocline lorencei ====
Cylindrocline lorencei, a sunflower relative (Asteraceae) from Mauritius, was declared extinct by 1990. In 1993, seeds and cuttings that had been collected in the 1970s were used to regenerate plants artificially in Brest, France, and the species was reintroduced to Mauritius in 2024.

== Animals ==
=== Breeding ===
==== Rastreadar Brasileiro ====
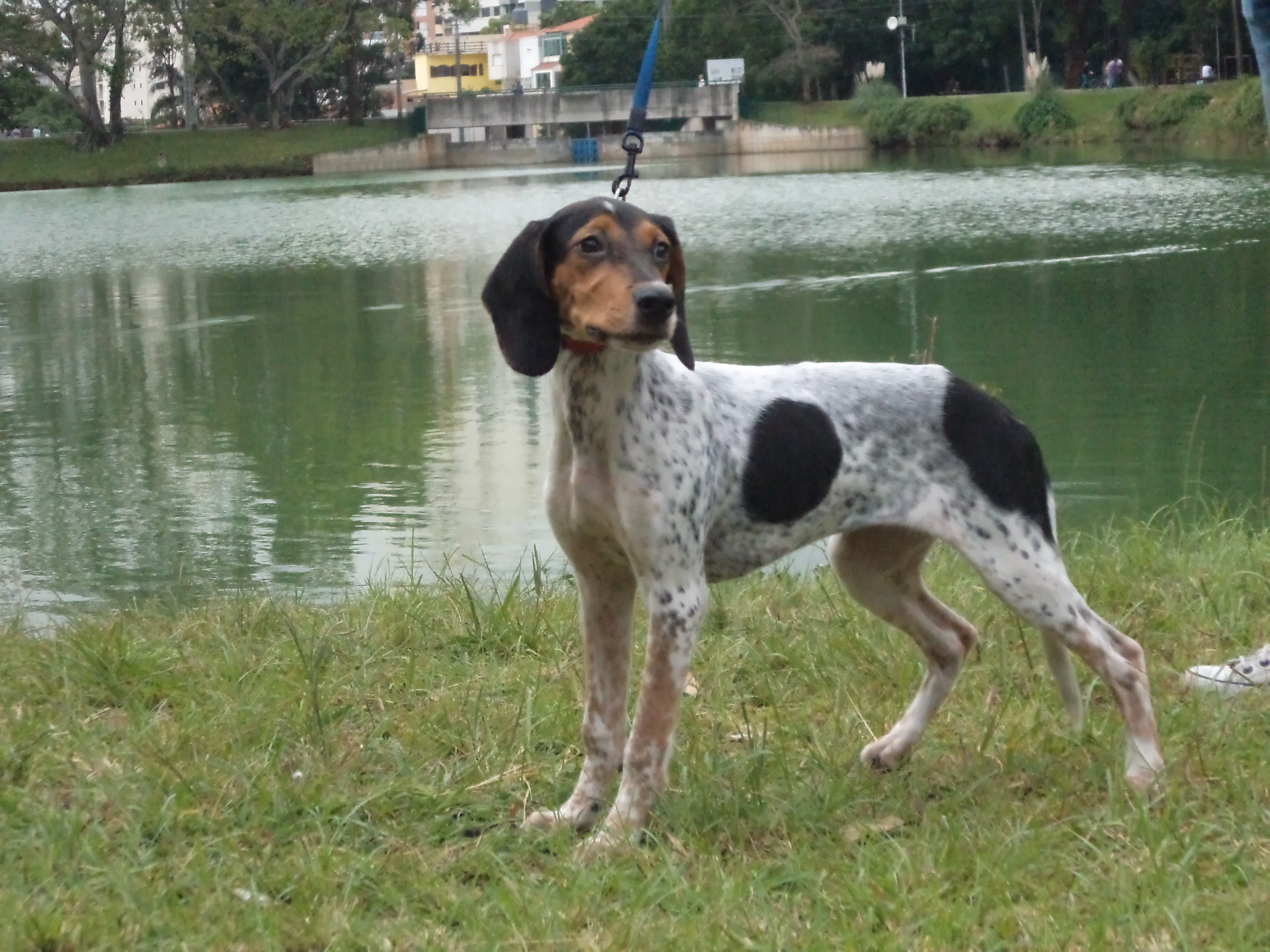
The Rastreador Brasileiro

The Rastreador Brasileiro (Brazilian Tracker) is a dog breed that was bred in the 1950s to aid in hunting jaguars and wild pigs in Brazil. In the early 2000s, a group named Grupo de Apoio ao Resgate do Rastreador Brasileiro (Brazilian Tracker Rescue Support Group) dedicated to reviving the breed and having it relisted by Confederação Brasileira de Cinofilia located dogs in Brazil that had genetics of the extinct breed to recreate a purebred. In 2013, the breed was de-extinct through successful preservation breeding from descendants of the final original members and was relisted by the FCI.

==== Floreana giant tortoise ====
The Floreana giant tortoise (Chelonoidis niger niger) is a subspecies of the Galápagos tortoise endemic to Floreana Island, Ecuador. In 2012, Floreana and Volcán Wolf tortoise hybrids were discovered on Isabela Island. Allegedly, these tortoises were imported or abandoned on the island in the early 19th century prior to the initial extinction of the subspecies in 1850, allowing them to hybridise with the native subspecies. In 2017, a breeding programme was established to revive the subspecies through back breeding the hybrids to regain their genetic purity. As of 2025, 400 Floreana giant tortoises have been hatched on Santa Cruz Island with plans to release them into the wild on Floreana Island following the successful removal of invasive species. However, the IUCN has yet to update the status of the subspecies from extinct to extinct in the wild or critically endangered due to lack of a genetically pure specimen and the de-extinct subspecies has yet to reproduce naturally in the wild.

=== Cloning ===
==== Pyrenean Ibex ====
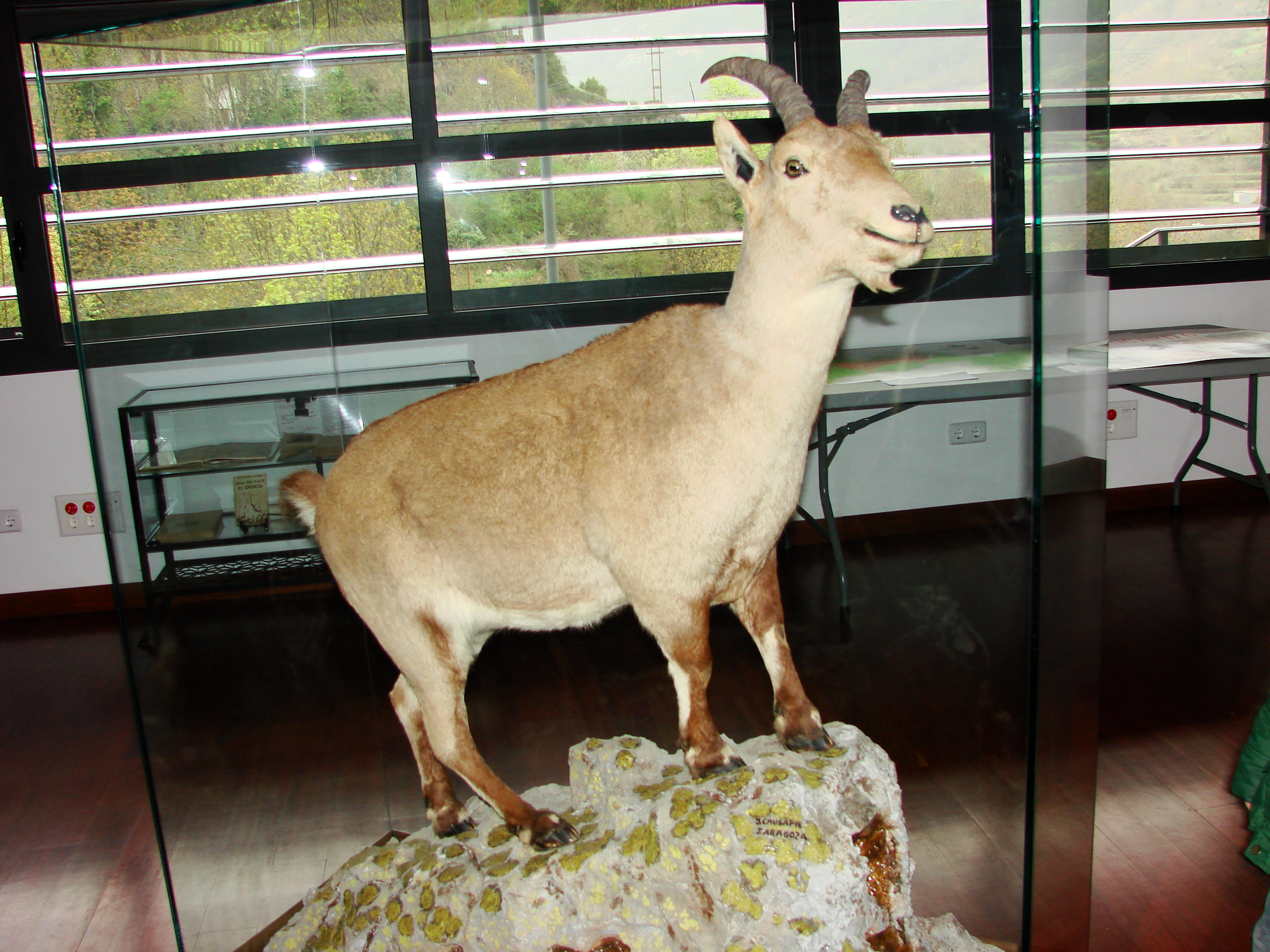
Stuffed specimen of "Celia", the endling that provided the genetic material for the cloning project.

The Pyrenean ibex (Capra pyrenaica pyrenaica) is an Iberian ibex subspecies that was the first animal to go extinct twice. Endemic to the Pyrenees and Cantabrian Mountains, this ibex was driven to extinction by the year 2000 due to competition with livestock and introduced wild ungulates, and solidified by the death of Celia, the endling of the subspecies. Several attempts were made to clone the Pyrenean ibex, and one individual was born to a domestic goat mother in 2003. However, this newborn died seven minutes after birth due to a lung defect.

== Others ==
=== Thawing ===
- Pithovirus sibericum: A 30,000-year-old giant virus resurrected in a sample of Siberian permafrost, buried below the surface of a late Pleistocene sediment.
- Panagrolaimus kolymaensis: This novel species of nematode was resurrected from cryptobiosis in 2023. The nematodes had been frozen in the Siberian permafrost since the Pleistocene, approximately 46,000 years ago.

== See also ==
- Lazarus taxon
- Rewilding
- Oldest viable seed
