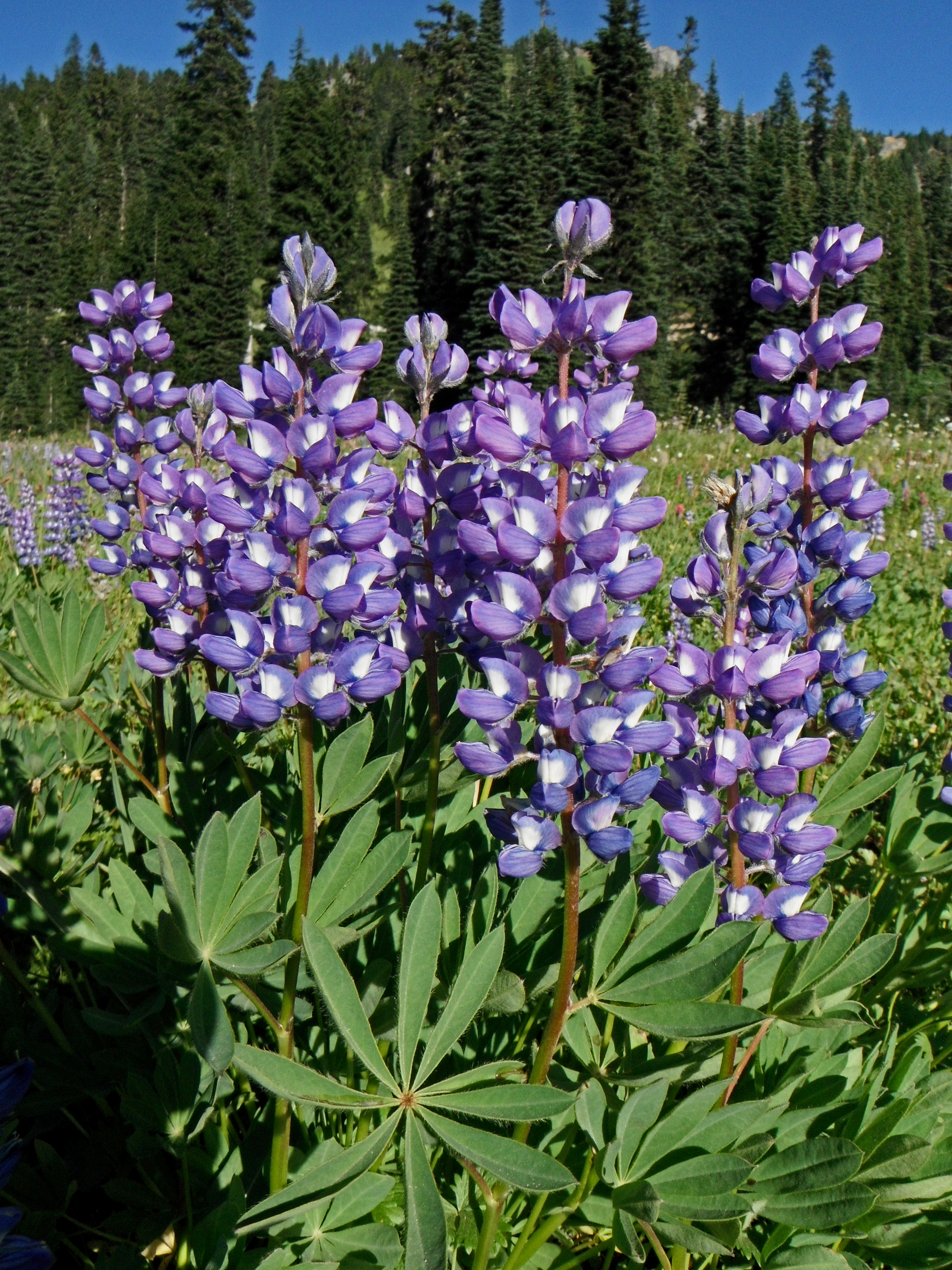

Scientific classification
- Kingdom: Plantae
- Clade: Tracheophytes
- Clade: Angiosperms
- Clade: Eudicots
- Clade: Rosids
- Order: Fabales
- Family: Fabaceae
- Subfamily: Faboideae
- Genus: Lupinus
- Species: L. arcticus

Binomial name
- Lupinus arcticus S.Wats.

= Lupinus arcticus =

Species of legume

Lupinus arcticus is a species of flowering plant in the subfamily Faboideae of the family Fabaceae, known by the common names Arctic lupine or subalpine lupine. It is native to northwestern North America, where it occurs from Oregon north to Alaska and east to Nunavut. It is a common wildflower in British Columbia.

This is a perennial herb growing from a taproot and producing erect stems up to 50 centimeters tall. The dark green, hairy leaves are borne upon rough, hairy petioles up to 17 centimeters long. The leaves are palmately compound, made up of 3 to 9 leaflets each measuring up to 6 centimeters long. The inflorescence is a raceme up to 15 centimeters long bearing up to 30 flowers. The flowers are usually blue, sometimes purple, and occasionally white. The banners of the pealike flowers may be tinged with pink. The fruit is a hairy, greenish to blackish legume pod 2 or 3 centimeters long. It contains up to 10 white-speckled black seeds each about half a centimeter long. The plant may hybridize with other lupine species when they grow together.

This plant grows in several types of habitat, including fields of sedge and moss, alpine regions, and the hills of the Canadian Arctic Archipelago. It grows on tundra and in moist and wet substrates.

This species has been the topic of some biological research. In 1967, seeds of this species were discovered in ancient lemming burrows dating back to the Pleistocene; the seeds were germinated and they produced plants, causing them to be declared the oldest viable seeds ever discovered. In 2009, a follow-up article detailed how radiocarbon dating was used to determine that the seeds were, in fact, just a few years old at the time of their discovery, and had probably fallen into the burrows not long before.

The plant contains a neurotoxin called sparteine, possibly as a deterrent to herbivores such as the snowshoe hare. The levels of sparteine in the leaves cycle, becoming higher at night, when herbivory is more likely to occur. In addition to the hare, species of ground squirrel have been known to feed on the plant.
