= Oldest viable seed =

Oldest seed known to have grown into a full plant

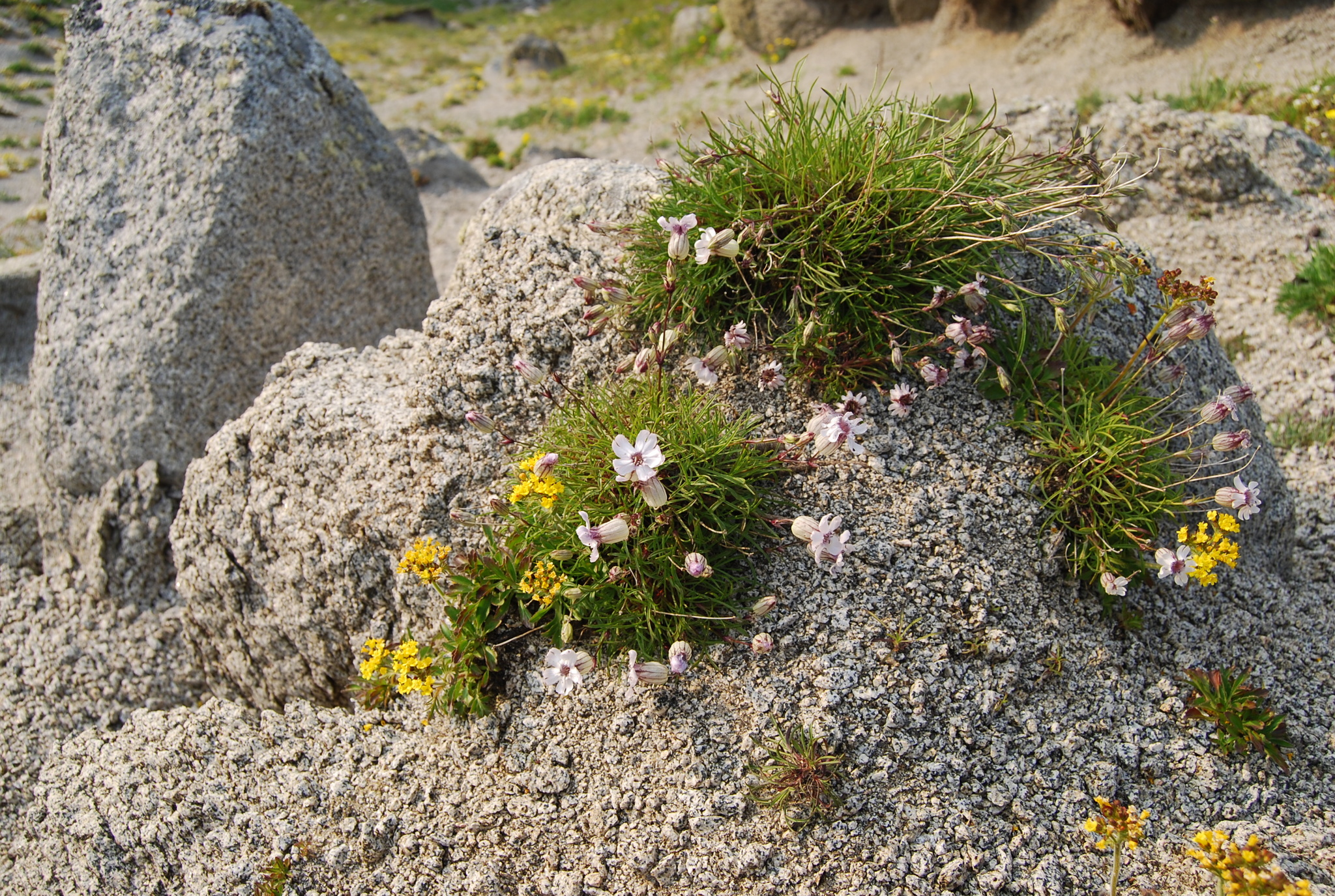
Wild narrow-leafed campion (Silene stenophylla)

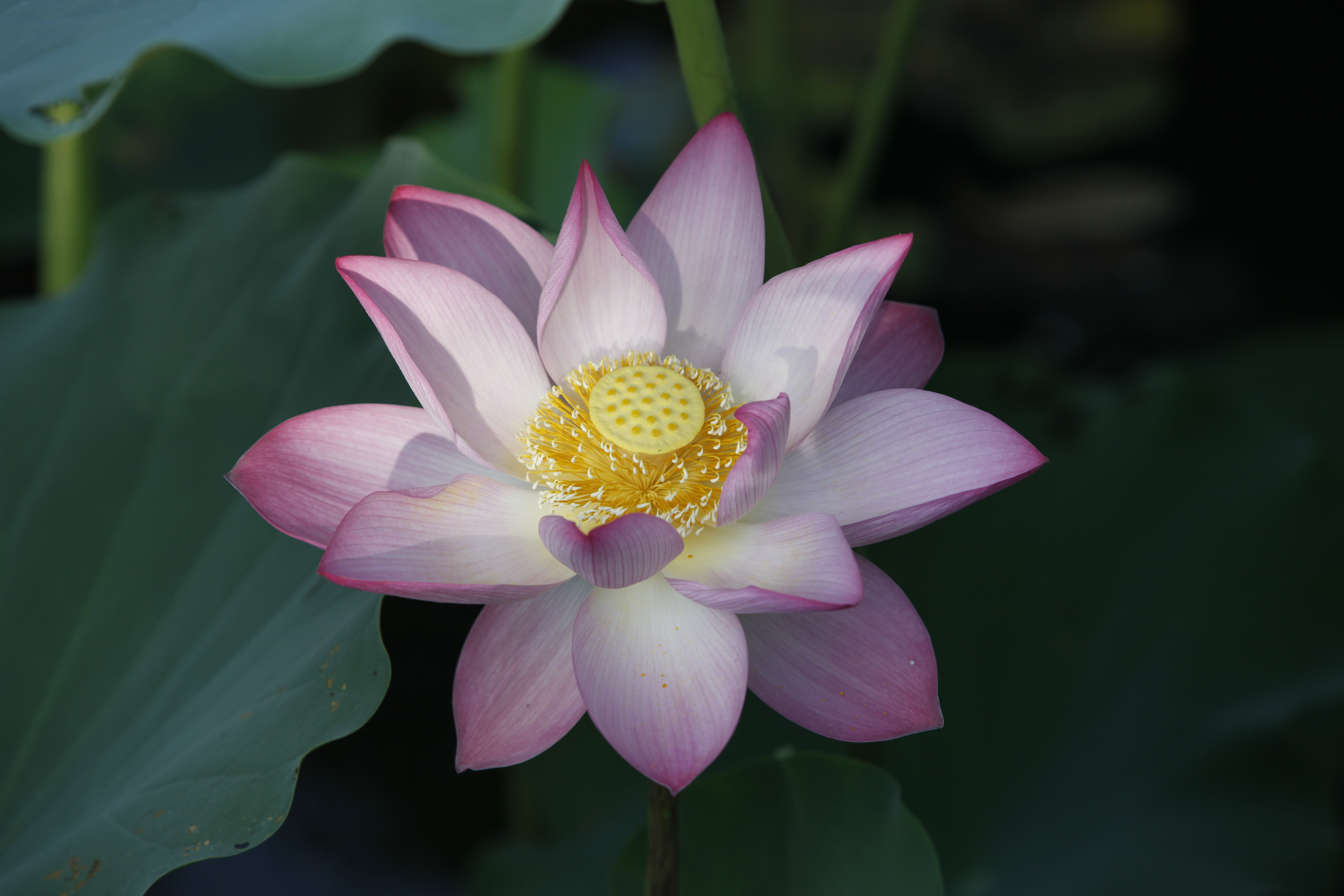
Wild sacred lotus (Nelumbo nucifera)

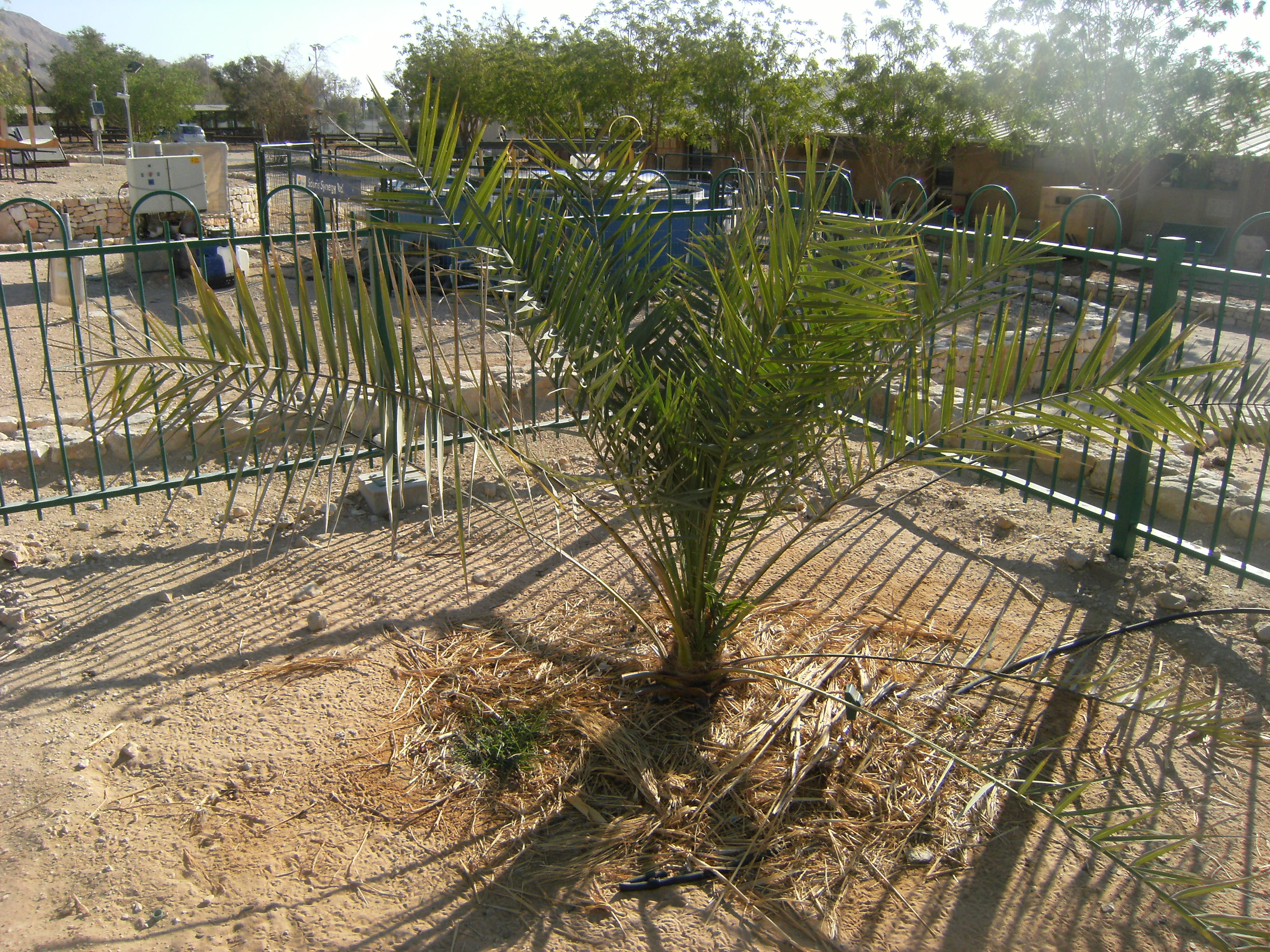
The Judean date palm "Methuselah" in Ketura, Israel

Several seeds have been known at different times as the oldest viable seed.

Dormancy allows seeds to survive for extended periods, which can aid in seed dispersal and spread out the growth and establishment of seedlings, increasing the likelihood that some of the next generations survive if conditions are not suitable for seedling establishment. Over time, seeds lose viability, which is the ability to initiate metabolic activity, cellular growth, and germination. Seeds have many cells and tissues that die over time, and these deaths can be delayed or increased by environmental conditions the seed experiences. Very generally, small seeds, especially from weedy species and annuals are more likely to remain viable in the soil longer than larger perennial seeds. The seeds of some aquatic plants also may remain viable longer in mud because their viability is aided by the aquatic environment which remains cool and moist.

== Carbon-dated ==
- The oldest viable seed that has grown into a full plant was a roughly 2,000-year-old Judean date palm seed, recovered during excavations at Herod the Great's palace on Masada. It had been preserved in a cool, dry place, not by freezing. It was germinated in 2005.
- The second oldest viable seed recorded is a 1,300-year-old sacred lotus (Nelumbo nucifera) recovered from a dry lake bed in northeastern China in 1995.
- A previously unknown species of Commiphora, possibly the source of the biblical medicinal extract tsori, was successfully germinated from a single seed in 2010 and carbon-dated to between AD 993 and 1202, more than 800 years old.

== Anecdotal ==
- In December, 2009, a Turkish newspaper reported a claim that a 4,000-year-old lentil had been successfully germinated.
- In 1954, arctic lupine seeds belonging to the species Lupinus arcticus were found in the Yukon Territory in glacial sediments, believed to be at least 10,000 years old. The seeds were germinated in 1966. Later, new dating techniques revealed that they were likely modern seeds (less than 10 years old) contaminating ancient rodent burrows.
- There was a persistent myth that seeds from ancient Egyptian tombs were viable. The myth was reportedly started by scam artists selling "miracle seed" designed to capitalize on European Egyptomania of the 1800s. In 1897, the claims were tested by the British Museum's director of Egyptian antiquities, E. A. Wallis Budge. Budge provided genuine 3,000-year-old tomb grains of wheat to the director of Royal Botanic Gardens, Kew, William Thiselton-Dyer to plant under controlled conditions. The test resulted in none germinating.

== Miscellaneous ==
- The oldest carbon-14-dated plant tissue that has grown into a viable adult plant was a Silene stenophylla (narrow-leafed campion), an Arctic flower native to Siberia. The plants were not grown from seeds because they were not viable, but the placental tissue of three fruits. Radiocarbon dating has confirmed an age of 31,800 ±300 years for the seeds. In 2007, more than 600,000 frozen mature and immature S. stenophylla seeds were found buried in 70 squirrel hibernation burrows 38 metres (125 ft) below the permafrost near the banks of the Kolyma River. The Arctic ground squirrels (Urocitellus parryii) are believed to have buried and damaged the mature seeds to prevent germination in the burrow, but three of the immature seeds contained viable placenta tissue, which was successfully grown in vitro. The plants grew, flowered, and created viable seeds of their own. The shape of the flowers differed from that of modern S. stenophylla plants with the petals being longer and more widely spaced than modern versions of the plant. Seeds produced by the regenerated plants germinated at a 100% success rate, compared with 90% for modern plants. Calculations of the gamma radiation dose (in grays; Gy) accumulated by the seeds since burial gave a reading of 0.07 kilograys (70 Gy), the highest dose recorded for seeds.

== See also ==
- Embryo rescue, producing a plant from embryo cells of a nonviable seed
- List of oldest trees
- Longevity
- Orthodox seed
- Plant tissue culture, producing a plant from non-embryo cells of a plant
- Seed bank
