= Seed =

Reproductive structure in plants

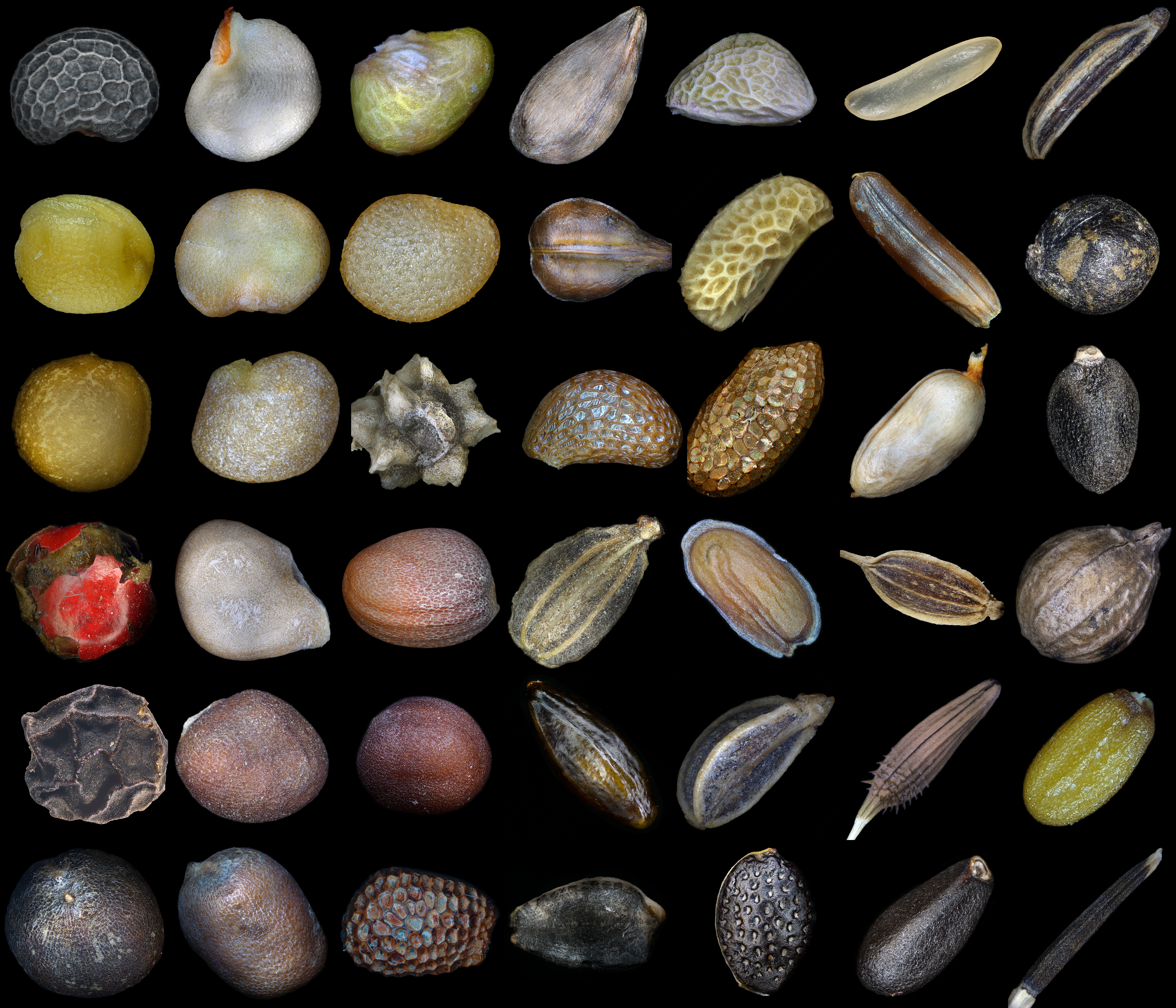
Photomicrograph of various seeds

In botany, a seed is a plant structure containing an embryo and stored nutrients in a protective coat called a testa. More generally, the term seed means anything that can be sown, which may include seed and husk or tuber. Seeds are the product of the ripened ovule, after the embryo sac is fertilized by sperm from pollen, forming a zygote. The embryo within a seed develops from the zygote and grows within the mother plant to a certain size before growth is halted.

The formation of the seed is the defining part of the process of reproduction in seed plants (spermatophytes). Other plants such as ferns, mosses and liverworts, do not have seeds and use water-dependent means to propagate themselves. Seed plants now dominate biological niches on land, from forests to grasslands both in hot and cold climates.

In the flowering plants, the ovary ripens into a fruit which contains the seed and serves to disseminate it. Many structures commonly referred to as "seeds" are actually dry fruits. Sunflower seeds are sometimes sold commercially while still enclosed within the hard wall of the fruit, which must be split open to reach the seed. Different groups of plants have other modifications, the so-called stone fruits (such as the peach) have a hardened fruit layer (the endocarp) fused to and surrounding the actual seed. Nuts are the one-seeded, hard-shelled fruit of some plants with an indehiscent seed, such as an acorn or hazelnut.

== History ==
The first land plants evolved around 468 million years ago, and reproduced using spores. The earliest seed bearing plants to appear were the gymnosperms, which have no ovaries to contain the seeds. They arose during the late Devonian period (416 million to 358 million years ago). From these early gymnosperms, seed ferns evolved during the Carboniferous period (359 to 299 million years ago); they had ovules that were borne in a cupule, which consisted of groups of enclosing branches likely used to protect the developing seed.

Published literature about seed storage, viability and its hygrometric dependence began in the early 19th century, influential works being:

- 1832 seed storage guide in Augustin Pyramus de Candolle's Conservation des Graines, part of his 3-volume Physiologie végétale, ou Exposition des forces et des fonctions vitales des végétaux (1832, v. 2, pp. 618–626, Paris); (translated title, "Plant physiology, or Exposition of the vital forces and functions of plants")
- 1846 viability studies by Augustin de Candolle, published in "Sur la durée relative de la faculté de germer des graines appartenant à diverses familles" (Annales des Sciences Naturelles; Botanique, 1846, III 6: 373–382); (translated title, "On the relative duration of the ability to germinate seeds belonging to various families")
- 1897 seed hygrometric studies by Victor Jodin (Annales Agronomiques, October 1897)
- 1912's Henry B. Guppy's 528 page "Studies in Seeds and Fruits- An Investigation with the Balance" (1912, London, England); subsequently reviewed in Science (June 1914, Washington, D.C.)

== Development ==
Stages of seed development: I Zygote; II Proembryo; III Globular / IV Heart; V Torpedo; VI Mature Embryo; Key: 1. Endosperm 2. Zygote 3. Embryo 4. Suspensor 5. Cotyledons 6. Shoot Apical Meristem 7. Root Apical Meristem 8. Radicle 9. Hypocotyl 10. Epicotyl 11. Seed Coat

Angiosperm (i.e., flowering plant) seeds are "enclosed seeds", produced in a hard or fleshy structure called a fruit that encloses them for protection. Some fruits have layers of both hard and fleshy material. In gymnosperms, no special structure develops to enclose the seeds, which begin their development "naked" on the bracts of cones. However, the seeds do become covered by the cone scales as they develop in some species of conifer.

Angiosperm seeds consist of three genetically distinct constituents: (1) the embryo formed from the zygote, (2) the endosperm, which is normally triploid, (3) the seed coat from tissue derived from the maternal tissue of the ovule. In angiosperms, the process of seed development begins with double fertilization, which involves the fusion of two male gametes with the egg cell and the central cell to form the primary endosperm and the zygote. Right after fertilization, the zygote is mostly inactive, but the primary endosperm divides rapidly to form the endosperm tissue. This tissue becomes the food the young plant will consume until the roots have developed after germination.

=== Ovule ===
Plant ovules: Gymnosperm ovule on left, angiosperm ovule (inside ovary) on right

After fertilization, the ovules develop into the seeds. The ovule consists of a number of components:

- The funicle (funiculus, funiculi) or seed stalk which attaches the ovule to the placenta and hence ovary or fruit wall, at the pericarp.
- The nucellus, the remnant of the megasporangium and main region of the ovule where the megagametophyte develops.
- The micropyle, a small pore or opening in the apex of the integument of the ovule where the pollen tube usually enters during the process of fertilization.
- The chalaza, the base of the ovule opposite the micropyle, where integument and nucellus are joined.

The shape of the ovules as they develop often affects the final shape of the seeds. Plants generally produce ovules of four shapes: the most common shape is called anatropous, with a curved shape. Orthotropous ovules are straight with all the parts of the ovule lined up in a long row producing an uncurved seed. Campylotropous ovules have a curved megagametophyte often giving the seed a tight "C" shape. The last ovule shape is called amphitropous, where the ovule is partly inverted and turned back 90 degrees on its stalk (the funicle or funiculus).

In the majority of flowering plants, the zygote's first division is transversely oriented in regards to the long axis, and this establishes the polarity of the embryo. The upper or chalazal pole becomes the main area of growth of the embryo, while the lower or micropylar pole produces the stalk-like suspensor that attaches to the micropyle. The suspensor absorbs and manufactures nutrients from the endosperm that are used during the embryo's growth.

=== Embryo ===
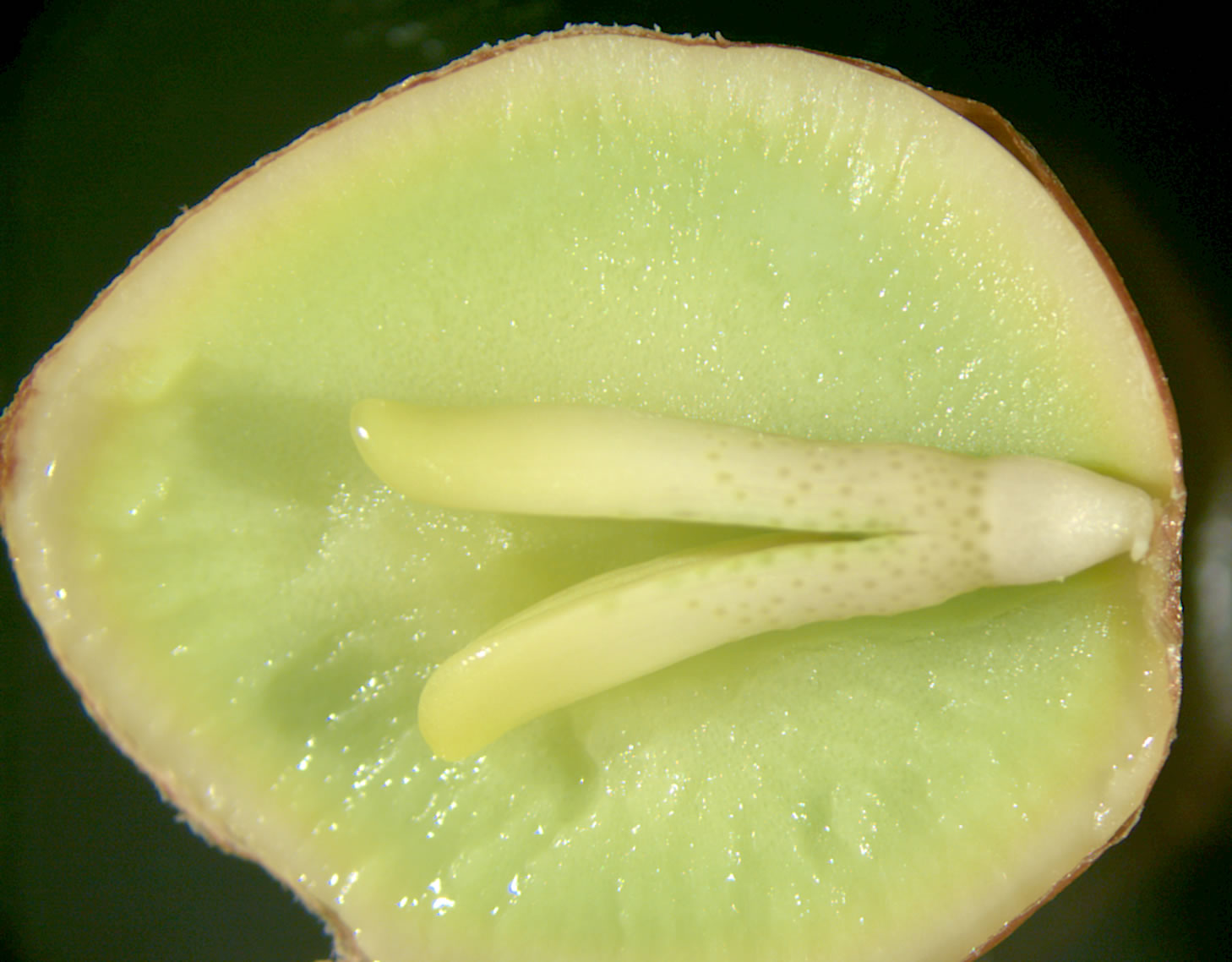
The inside of a Ginkgo seed, showing a well-developed embryo, nutritive tissue (megagametophyte), and a bit of the surrounding seed coat

The main components of the embryo are:

- The cotyledons, the seed leaves, attached to the embryonic axis. There may be one (Monocotyledons), or two (Dicotyledons). The cotyledons are also the source of nutrients in the non-endospermic dicotyledons, in which case they replace the endosperm, and are thick and leathery. In endospermic seeds, the cotyledons are thin and papery. Dicotyledons have the point of attachment opposite one another on the axis.
- The epicotyl, the embryonic axis above the point of attachment of the cotyledon(s).
- The plumule, the tip of the epicotyl, and has a feathery appearance due to the presence of young leaf primordia at the apex, and will become the shoot upon germination.
- The hypocotyl, the embryonic axis below the point of attachment of the cotyledon(s), connecting the epicotyl and the radicle, being the stem-root transition zone.
- The radicle, the basal tip of the hypocotyl, grows into the primary root.

Monocotyledonous plants have two additional structures in the form of sheaths. The plumule is covered with a coleoptile that forms the first leaf while the radicle is covered with a coleorhiza that connects to the primary root and adventitious roots form the sides. Here the hypocotyl is a rudimentary axis between radicle and plumule. The seeds of corn are constructed with these structures; pericarp, scutellum (single large cotyledon) that absorbs nutrients from the endosperm, plumule, radicle, coleoptile, and coleorhiza – these last two structures are sheath-like and enclose the plumule and radicle, acting as a protective covering.

=== Seed coat ===
The maturing ovule undergoes marked changes in the integuments, generally a reduction and disorganization but occasionally a thickening. The seed coat forms from the two integuments or outer layers of cells of the ovule, which derive from tissue from the mother plant, the inner integument forms the tegmen and the outer forms the testa. (The seed coats of some monocotyledon plants, such as the grasses, are not distinct structures, but are fused with the fruit wall to form a pericarp.) The testae of both monocots and dicots are often marked with patterns and textured markings, or have wings or tufts of hair. When the seed coat forms from only one layer, it is also called the testa, though not all such testae are homologous from one species to the next. The funiculus abscisses (detaches at fixed point – abscission zone), the scar forming an oval depression, the hilum. Anatropous ovules have a portion of the funiculus that is adnate (fused to the seed coat), and which forms a longitudinal ridge, or raphe, just above the hilum. In bitegmic ovules (e.g. Gossypium described here) both inner and outer integuments contribute to the seed coat formation. With continuing maturation the cells enlarge in the outer integument. While the inner epidermis may remain a single layer, it may also divide to produce two to three layers and accumulates starch, and is referred to as the colourless layer. By contrast, the outer epidermis becomes tanniferous. The inner integument may consist of eight to fifteen layers.

As the cells enlarge, and starch is deposited in the outer layers of the pigmented zone below the outer epidermis, this zone begins to lignify, while the cells of the outer epidermis enlarge radially and their walls thicken, with nucleus and cytoplasm compressed into the outer layer. these cells which are broader on their inner surface are called palisade cells. In the inner epidermis, the cells also enlarge radially with plate like thickening of the walls. The mature inner integument has a palisade layer, a pigmented zone with 15–20 layers, while the innermost layer is known as the fringe layer.

==== Gymnosperms ====
In gymnosperms, which do not form ovaries, the ovules and hence the seeds are exposed. This is the basis for their nomenclature – naked seeded plants. Two sperm cells transferred from the pollen do not develop the seed by double fertilization, but one sperm nucleus unites with the egg nucleus and the other sperm is not used. Sometimes each sperm fertilizes an egg cell and one zygote is then aborted or absorbed during early development. The seed is composed of the embryo (the result of fertilization) and tissue from the mother plant, which also form a cone around the seed in coniferous plants such as pine and spruce.

== Shape and appearance ==
Seeds are very diverse, and as such there are many terms are used to describe them.

=== Terms to describe shape ===
- Bean-shaped (reniform) – resembling a kidney, with lobed ends on either side of the hilum
- Square or Oblong – angular, with all sides being either equal, or longer-than-wide
- Triangular – three-sided, broadest below the middle
- Elliptic or Ovate or Obovate – rounded at both ends, or egg shaped (ovate or obovate, broader at one end), being rounded but either symmetrical about the middle, or broader below the middle, or broader above the middle
- Discoid – resembling a disc or plate, having both thickness and parallel faces and with a rounded margin)
- Ellipsoid
- Globose – spherical
- Subglobose (Inflated, but less than spherical)
- Lenticular
- Ovoid
- Sectoroid
- Other common descriptors for seeds focus on color, texture, and form. Striate seeds are striped with parallel, longitudinal lines or ridges. The most common colours are brown and black, with other colours appearing less frequently. The surface texture varies from highly polished to considerably roughened. The surface may also have a variety of appendages (see Seed coat), and be described by terms such as papillate or digitiform (finger-like). A seed coat with the consistency of cork is referred to as suberose. Other terms include crustaceous (hard, thin or brittle).

== Structure ==
The parts of a bean seed (a dicot), showing the seed coat and embryo

Diagram of the internal structure of a dicot seed and embryo: (a) seed coat, (b) endosperm, (c) cotyledon, (d) hypocotyl

A typical seed includes two basic parts:

1. an embryo;
2. a seed coat.

In addition, the endosperm forms a supply of nutrients for the embryo in most monocotyledons and the endospermic dicotyledons.

=== Seed types ===
Seeds have been considered to occur in many structurally different types (Martin 1946). These are based on a number of criteria, of which the dominant one is the embryo-to-seed size ratio. This reflects the degree to which the developing cotyledons absorb the nutrients of the endosperm, and thus obliterate it.

Six types occur amongst the monocotyledons, ten in the dicotyledons, and two in the gymnosperms (linear and spatulate). This classification is based on three characteristics: embryo morphology, amount of endosperm and the position of the embryo relative to the endosperm.

Diagram of a generalized dicot seed (1) versus a generalized monocot seed (2). A. Scutellum B. Cotyledon C. Hilum D. Plumule E. Radicle F. Endosperm

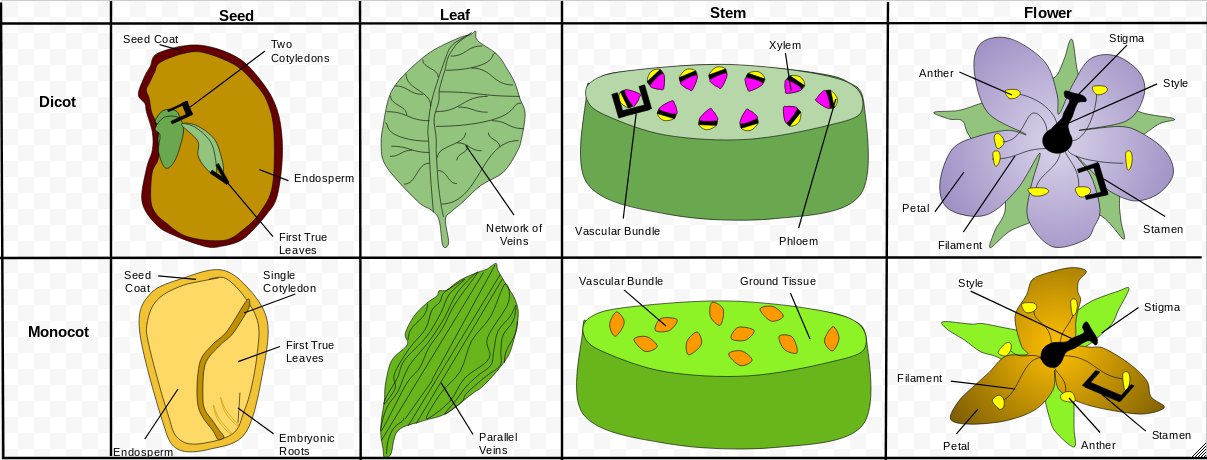
Comparison of monocotyledons and dicotyledons

=== Embryo ===
In endospermic seeds, there are two distinct regions inside the seed coat, an upper and larger endosperm and a lower smaller embryo. The embryo is the fertilised ovule, an immature plant from which a new plant will grow under proper conditions. The embryo has one cotyledon or seed leaf in monocotyledons, two cotyledons in almost all dicotyledons and two or more in gymnosperms. In the fruit of grains (caryopses) the single monocotyledon is shield shaped and hence called a scutellum. The scutellum is pressed closely against the endosperm from which it absorbs food and passes it to the growing parts. Embryo descriptors include small, straight, bent, curved, and curled.

=== Nutrient storage ===
Within the seed, there usually is a store of nutrients for the seedling that will grow from the embryo. The form of the stored nutrition varies depending on the kind of plant. In angiosperms, the stored food begins as a tissue called the endosperm, which is derived from the mother plant and the pollen via double fertilization. It is usually triploid, and is rich in oil or starch, and protein. In gymnosperms, such as conifers, the food storage tissue (also called endosperm) is part of the female gametophyte, a haploid tissue. The endosperm is surrounded by the aleurone layer (peripheral endosperm), filled with proteinaceous aleurone grains.

Originally, by analogy with the animal ovum, the outer nucellus layer (perisperm) was referred to as albumen, and the inner endosperm layer as vitellus. Although misleading, the term began to be applied to all the nutrient matter. This terminology persists in referring to endospermic seeds as "albuminous". The nature of this material is used in both describing and classifying seeds, in addition to the embryo to endosperm size ratio. The endosperm may be considered to be farinaceous (or mealy) in which the cells are filled with starch, as for instance cereal grains, or not (non-farinaceous). The endosperm may also be referred to as "fleshy" or "cartilaginous" with thicker soft cells such as coconut, but may also be oily as in Ricinus (castor oil), Croton and Poppy. The endosperm is called "horny" when the cell walls are thicker such as date and coffee, or "ruminated" if mottled, as in nutmeg, palms and Annonaceae.

In most monocotyledons (such as grasses and palms) and some (endospermic or albuminous) dicotyledons (such as castor beans) the embryo is embedded in the endosperm (and nucellus), which the seedling will use upon germination. In the non-endospermic dicotyledons the endosperm is absorbed by the embryo as the latter grows within the developing seed, and the cotyledons of the embryo become filled with stored food. At maturity, seeds of these species have no endosperm and are also referred to as exalbuminous seeds. The exalbuminous seeds include the legumes (such as beans and peas), trees such as the oak and walnut, vegetables such as squash and radish, and sunflowers. According to Bewley and Black (1978), Brazil nut storage is in hypocotyl and this place of storage is uncommon among seeds. All gymnosperm seeds are albuminous.

=== Seed coat ===
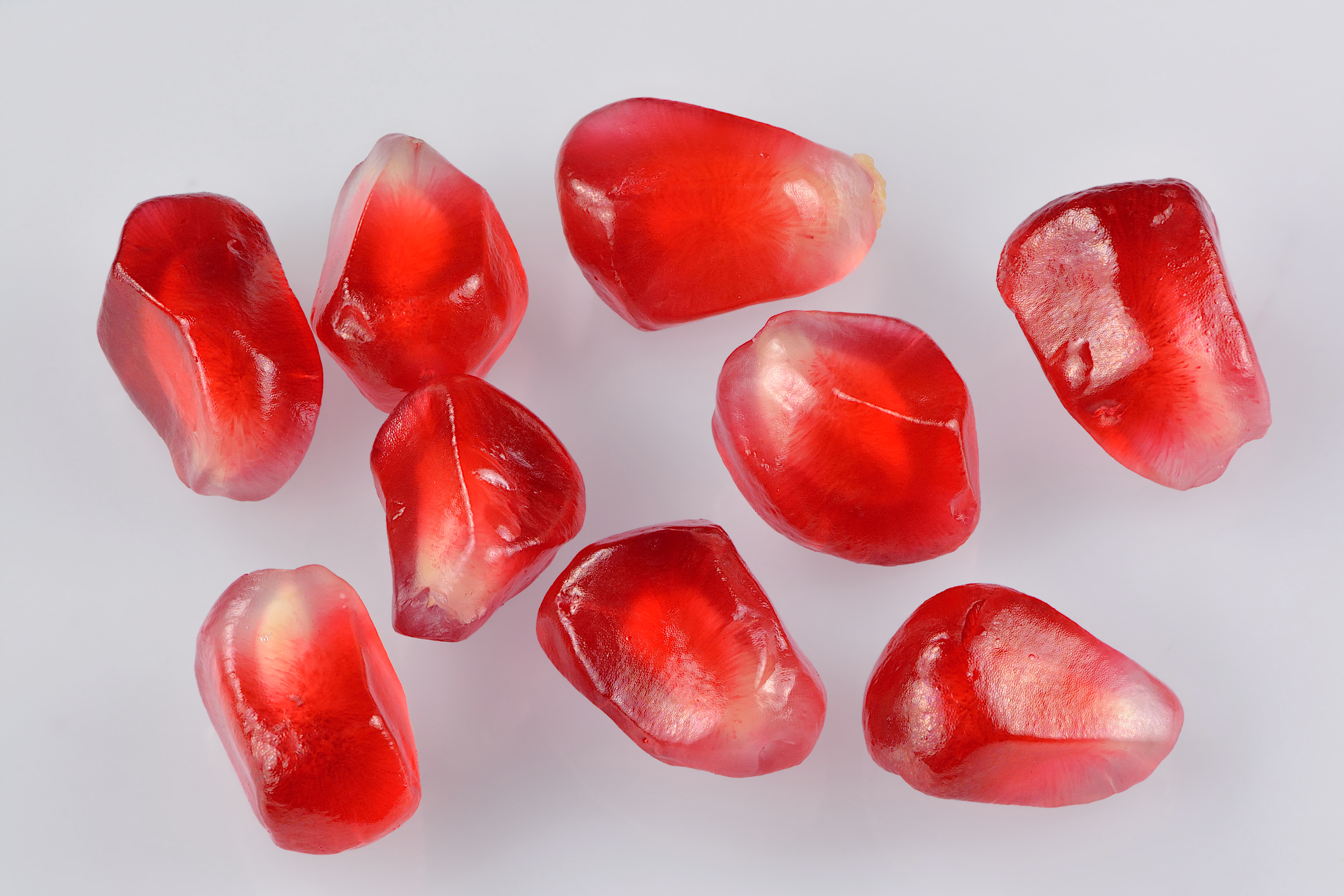
Seed coat of pomegranate

The seed coat develops from the maternal tissue, the integuments, originally surrounding the ovule. The seed coat in the mature seed can be a paper-thin layer (e.g. peanut) or something more substantial (e.g. thick and hard in honey locust and coconut), or fleshy as in the sarcotesta of pomegranate. The seed coat helps protect the embryo from mechanical injury, predators, and drying out. Depending on its development, the seed coat is either bitegmic or unitegmic. Bitegmic seeds form a testa from the outer integument and a tegmen from the inner integument while unitegmic seeds have only one integument. Usually, parts of the testa or tegmen form a hard protective mechanical layer. The mechanical layer may prevent water penetration and germination. Amongst the barriers may be the presence of lignified sclereids.

The outer integument has a number of layers, generally between four and eight organised into three layers: (a) outer epidermis, (b) outer pigmented zone of two to five layers containing tannin and starch, and (c) inner epidermis. The endotegmen is derived from the inner epidermis of the inner integument, the exotegmen from the outer surface of the inner integument. The endotesta is derived from the inner epidermis of the outer integument, and the outer layer of the testa from the outer surface of the outer integument is referred to as the exotesta. If the exotesta is also the mechanical layer, this is called an exotestal seed, but if the mechanical layer is the endotegmen, then the seed is endotestal. The exotesta may consist of one or more rows of cells that are elongated and pallisade like (e.g. Fabaceae), hence 'palisade exotesta'.

In addition to the three basic seed parts, some seeds have an appendage, an aril, a fleshy outgrowth of the funicle (funiculus), (as in yew and nutmeg) or an oily appendage, an elaiosome (as in Corydalis), or hairs (trichomes). In the latter example these hairs are the source of the textile crop cotton. Other seed appendages include the raphe (a ridge), wings, caruncles (a soft spongy outgrowth from the outer integument in the vicinity of the micropyle), spines, or tubercles.

A scar also may remain on the seed coat, called the hilum, where the seed was attached to the ovary wall by the funicle. Just below it is a small pore, representing the micropyle of the ovule.

=== Size and seed set ===
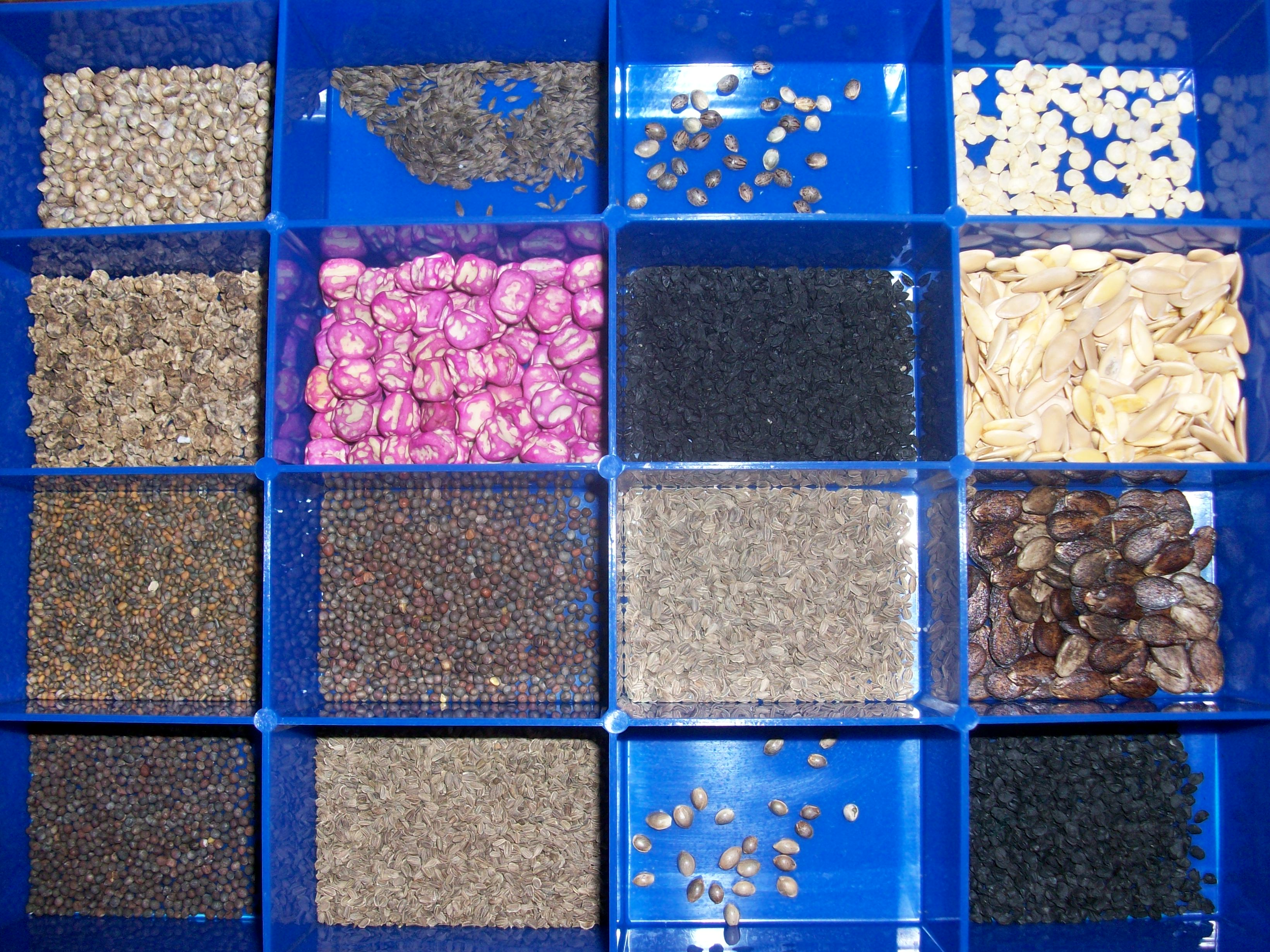
A collection of various vegetable and herb seeds

Seeds are very diverse in size. The dust-like orchid seeds are the smallest, with about one million seeds per gram, with the record being for Anguloa × ruckeri with a single seed weighing about 0.4 μg. They are often embryonic seeds with immature embryos and no significant energy reserves. Orchids and a few other groups of plants are mycoheterotrophs which depend on mycorrhizal fungi for nutrition during germination and the early growth of the seedling. Some terrestrial orchid seedlings, in fact, spend the first few years of their lives deriving energy from fungi and do not produce green leaves. The largest seed is that of Lodoicea maldivica (coco de mer) at up to 25 kg (55 lb). Plants that produce smaller seeds can generate many more seeds per flower, while plants with larger seeds invest more resources into those seeds and normally produce fewer seeds. Small seeds are quicker to ripen and can be dispersed sooner, so autumnal blooming plants often have small seeds. Many annual plants produce great quantities of smaller seeds; this helps to ensure at least a few will end in a favorable place for growth. Herbaceous perennials and woody plants often have larger seeds; they can produce seeds over many years, and larger seeds have more energy reserves for germination and seedling growth and produce larger, more established seedlings after germination.

== Functions ==
Seeds serve several functions for the plants that produce them. Key among these functions are nourishment of the embryo, dispersal to a new location, and dormancy during unfavorable conditions. Seeds fundamentally are means of reproduction, and most seeds are the product of sexual reproduction which produces a remixing of genetic material and phenotype variability on which natural selection acts. Plant seeds hold endophytic microorganisms that can perform various functions, the most important of which is protection against disease.

=== Embryo nourishment ===
Seeds protect and nourish the embryo or young plant. They usually give a seedling a faster start than a sporeling from a spore, because of the larger food reserves in the seed and the multicellularity of the enclosed embryo.

=== Dispersal ===
Unlike animals, plants are limited in their ability to seek out favorable conditions for life and growth. As a result, plants have evolved many ways to disperse their offspring by dispersing their seeds (see also vegetative reproduction). A seed must somehow "arrive" at a location and be there at a time favorable for germination and growth. When the fruits open and release their seeds in a regular way, it is called dehiscent, which is often distinctive for related groups of plants; these fruits include capsules, follicles, legumes, silicles and siliques. When fruits do not open and release their seeds in a regular fashion, they are called indehiscent, which include the fruits achenes, caryopses, nuts, samaras, and utricles.

==== By wind (anemochory) ====
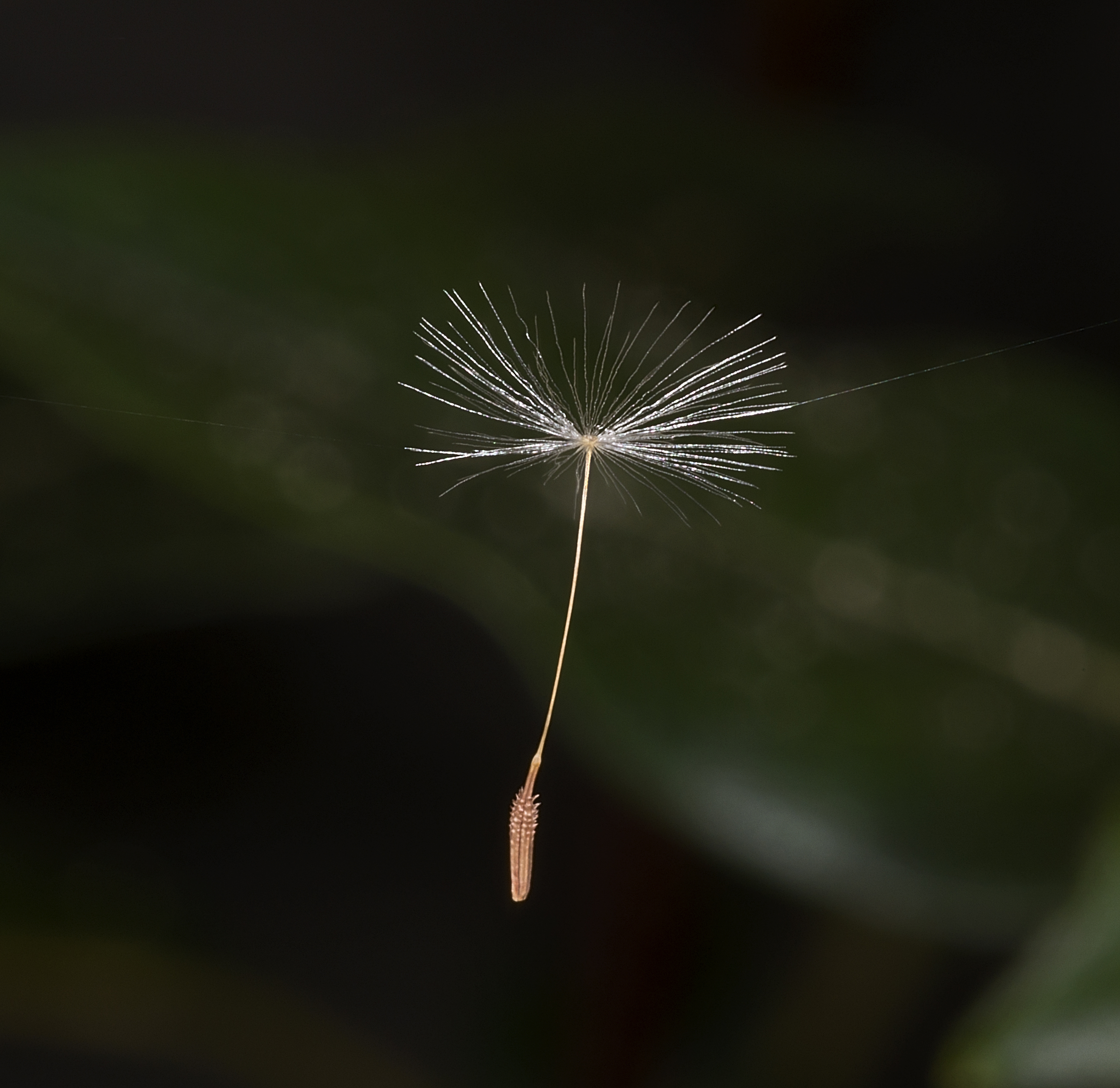
Dandelion seeds are contained within achenes, which can be carried long distances by the wind.

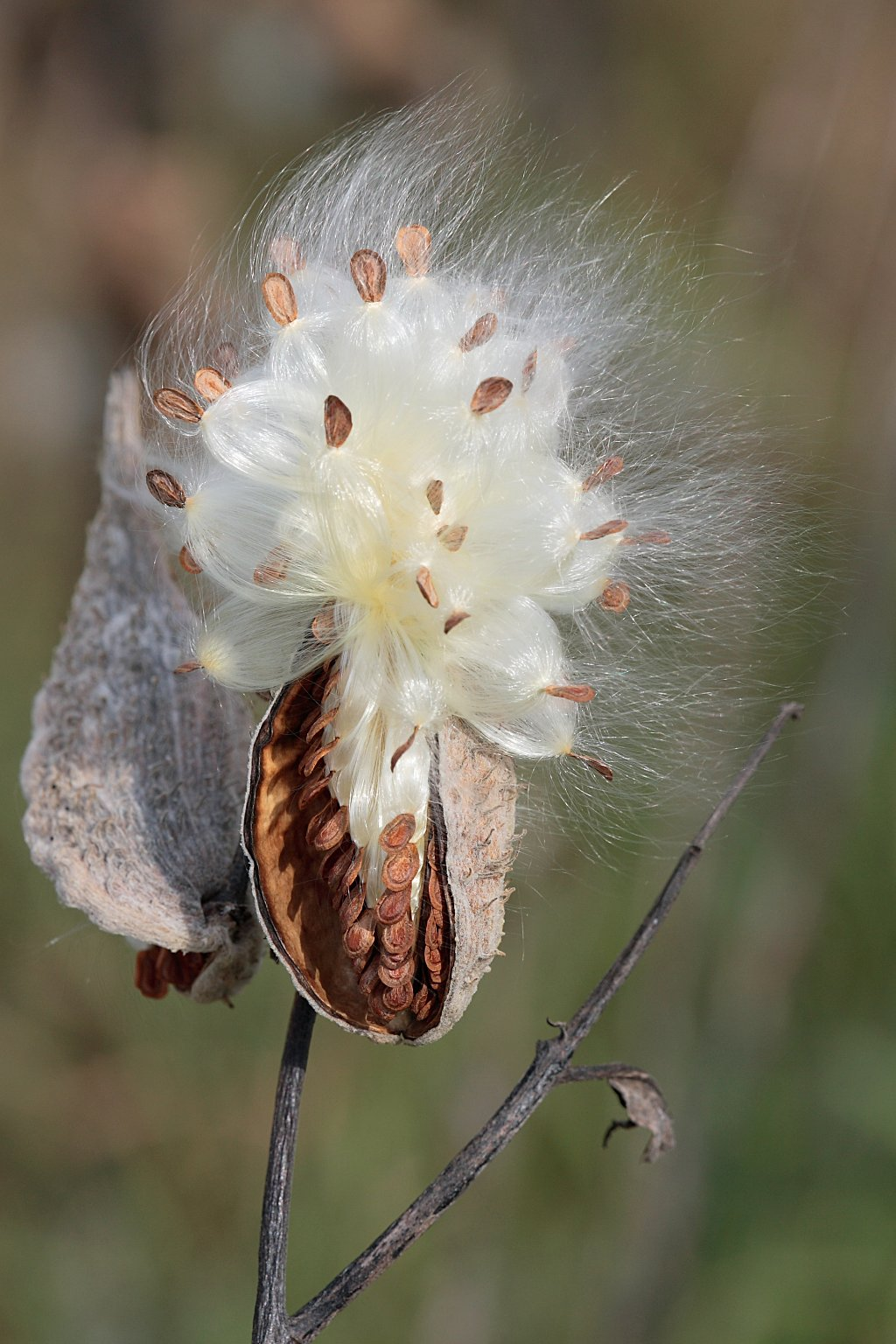
The seed pod of milkweed (Asclepias syriaca)

- Some seeds (e.g., pine) have a wing that aids in wind dispersal.
- The dustlike seeds of orchids are carried efficiently by the wind.
- Some seeds (e.g. milkweed, poplar) have hairs that aid in wind dispersal.

Other seeds are enclosed in fruit structures that aid wind dispersal in similar ways:

- Dandelion achenes have hairs.
- Maple samaras have two wings.

==== By water (hydrochory) ====
- Some plants, such as Mucuna and Dioclea, produce buoyant seeds termed sea-beans or drift seeds because they float in rivers to the oceans and wash up on beaches.

==== By animals (zoochory) ====
- Seeds (burrs) with barbs or hooks (e.g. acaena, burdock, dock) which attach to animal fur or feathers, and then drop off later.
- Seeds with a fleshy covering (e.g. apple, cherry, juniper) are eaten by animals (birds, mammals, reptiles, fish) which then disperse these seeds in their droppings.
- Seeds (nuts) are attractive long-term storable food resources for animals (e.g. acorns, hazelnut, walnut); the seeds are stored some distance from the parent plant, and some escape being eaten if the animal forgets them.

Myrmecochory is the dispersal of seeds by ants. Foraging ants disperse seeds which have appendages called elaiosomes (e.g. bloodroot, trilliums, acacias, and many species of Proteaceae). Elaiosomes are soft, fleshy structures that contain nutrients for animals that eat them. The ants carry such seeds back to their nest, where the elaiosomes are eaten. The remainder of the seed, which is hard and inedible to the ants, then germinates either within the nest or at a removal site where the seed has been discarded by the ants. This dispersal relationship is an example of mutualism, since the plants depend upon the ants to disperse seeds, while the ants depend upon the plants seeds for food. As a result, a drop in numbers of one partner can reduce success of the other. In South Africa, the Argentine ant (Linepithema humile) has invaded and displaced native species of ants. Unlike the native ant species, Argentine ants do not collect the seeds of Mimetes cucullatus or eat the elaiosomes. In areas where these ants have invaded, the numbers of Mimetes seedlings have dropped.

=== Dormancy ===
Seed dormancy has two main functions: the first is synchronizing germination with the optimal conditions for survival of the resulting seedling; the second is spreading germination of a batch of seeds over time so a catastrophe (e.g. late frosts, drought, herbivory) does not result in the death of all offspring of a plant (bet-hedging). Seed dormancy is defined as a seed failing to germinate under environmental conditions optimal for germination, normally when the environment is at a suitable temperature with proper soil moisture. This true dormancy or innate dormancy is therefore caused by conditions within the seed that prevent germination. Thus dormancy is a state of the seed, not of the environment. Induced dormancy, enforced dormancy or seed quiescence occurs when a seed fails to germinate because the external environmental conditions are inappropriate for germination, mostly in response to conditions being too dark or light, too cold or hot, or too dry.

Seed dormancy is not the same as seed persistence in the soil or on the plant, though even in scientific publications dormancy and persistence are often confused or used as synonyms.

Often, seed dormancy is divided into four major categories: exogenous; endogenous; combinational; and secondary. A more recent system distinguishes five classes: morphological, physiological, morphophysiological, physical, and combinational dormancy.

Exogenous dormancy is caused by conditions outside the embryo, including:

- Physical dormancy or hard seed coats occurs when seeds are impermeable to water. At dormancy break, a specialized structure, the 'water gap', is disrupted in response to environmental cues, especially temperature, so water can enter the seed and germination can occur. Plant families where physical dormancy occurs include Anacardiaceae, Cannaceae, Convulvulaceae, Fabaceae and Malvaceae.
- Chemical dormancy considers species that lack physiological dormancy, but where a chemical prevents germination. This chemical can be leached out of the seed by rainwater or snow melt or be deactivated somehow. Leaching of chemical inhibitors from the seed by rain water is often cited as an important cause of dormancy release in seeds of desert plants, but little evidence exists to support this claim.

Endogenous dormancy is caused by conditions within the embryo itself, including:

- In morphological dormancy, germination is prevented due to morphological characteristics of the embryo. In some species, the embryo is just a mass of cells when seeds are dispersed; it is not differentiated. Before germination can take place, both differentiation and growth of the embryo have to occur. In other species, the embryo is differentiated but not fully grown (underdeveloped) at dispersal, and embryo growth up to a species specific length is required before germination can occur. Examples of plant families where morphological dormancy occurs are Apiaceae, Cycadaceae, Liliaceae, Magnoliaceae and Ranunculaceae.
- Morphophysiological dormancy includes seeds with underdeveloped embryos, and also have physiological components to dormancy. These seeds, therefore, require a dormancy-breaking treatments, as well as a period of time to develop fully grown embryos. Plant families where morphophysiological dormancy occurs include Apiaceae, Aquifoliaceae, Liliaceae, Magnoliaceae, Papaveraceae and Ranunculaceae. Some plants with morphophysiological dormancy, such as Asarum or Trillium species, have multiple types of dormancy, one affects radicle (root) growth, while the other affects plumule (shoot) growth. The terms "double dormancy" and "two-year seeds" are used for species whose seeds need two years to complete germination or at least two winters and one summer. Dormancy of the radicle (seedling root) is broken during the first winter after dispersal while dormancy of the shoot bud is broken during the second winter.
- Physiological dormancy means the embryo, due to physiological causes, cannot generate enough power to break through the seed coat, endosperm or other covering structures. Dormancy is typically broken at cool wet, warm wet, or warm dry conditions. Abscisic acid is usually the growth inhibitor in seeds, and its production can be affected by light.
  - Drying, in some plants, including a number of grasses and those from seasonally arid regions, is needed before they will germinate. The seeds are released, but need to have a lower moisture content before germination can begin. If the seeds remain moist after dispersal, germination can be delayed for many months or even years. Many herbaceous plants from temperate climate zones have physiological dormancy that disappears with drying of the seeds. Other species will germinate after dispersal only under very narrow temperature ranges, but as the seeds dry, they are able to germinate over a wider temperature range.
- In seeds with combinational dormancy, the seed or fruit coat is impermeable to water and the embryo has physiological dormancy. Depending on the species, physical dormancy can be broken before or after physiological dormancy is broken.
- Secondary dormancy* is caused by conditions after the seed has been dispersed and occurs in some seeds when nondormant seed is exposed to conditions that are not favorable to germination, very often high temperatures. The mechanisms of secondary dormancy are not yet fully understood, but might involve the loss of sensitivity in receptors in the plasma membrane.

The following types of seed dormancy do not involve seed dormancy, strictly speaking, as lack of germination is prevented by the environment, not by characteristics of the seed itself (see Germination):

- Photodormancy or light sensitivity affects germination of some seeds. These photoblastic seeds need a period of darkness or light to germinate. In species with thin seed coats, light may be able to penetrate into the dormant embryo. The presence of light or the absence of light may trigger the germination process, inhibiting germination in some seeds buried too deeply or in others not buried in the soil.
- Thermodormancy is seed sensitivity to heat or cold. Some seeds, including cocklebur and amaranth, germinate only at high temperatures (30 °C or 86 °F); many plants that have seeds that germinate in early to midsummer have thermodormancy, so germinate only when the soil temperature is warm. Other seeds need cool soils to germinate, while others, such as celery, are inhibited when soil temperatures are too warm. Often, thermodormancy requirements disappear as the seed ages or dries.

Not all seeds undergo a period of dormancy. Seeds of some mangroves are viviparous; they begin to germinate while still attached to the parent. The large, heavy root allows the seed to penetrate into the ground when it falls. Many garden plant seeds will germinate readily as soon as they have water and are warm enough; though their wild ancestors may have had dormancy, these cultivated plants lack it. After many generations of selective pressure by plant breeders and gardeners, dormancy has been selected out.

For annuals, seeds are a way for the species to survive dry or cold seasons. Ephemeral plants are usually annuals that can go from seed to seed in as few as six weeks.

== Germination ==
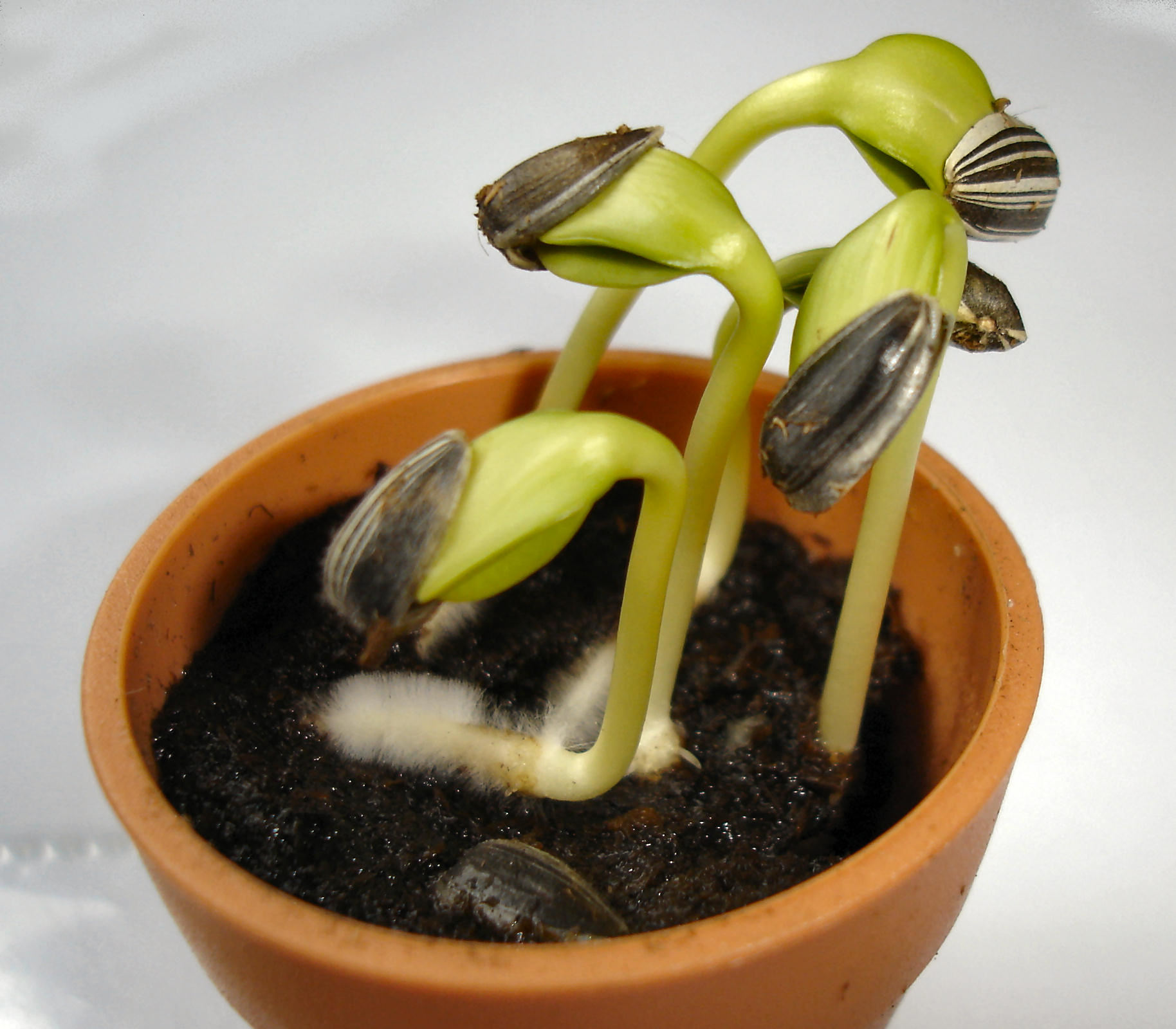
Germinating sunflower seedlings

Seed germination is a process by which a seed embryo develops into a seedling. It involves the reactivation of the metabolic pathways that lead to growth and the emergence of the radicle or seed root and plumule or shoot. The emergence of the seedling above the soil surface is the next phase of the plant's growth and is called seedling establishment.

Three fundamental conditions must exist before germination can occur. (1) The embryo must be alive, called seed viability. (2) Any dormancy requirements that prevent germination must be overcome. (3) The proper environmental conditions must exist for germination.

Far red light can prevent germination.

Seed viability is the ability of the embryo to germinate and is affected by a number of different conditions. Some plants do not produce seeds that have functional complete embryos, or the seed may have no embryo at all, often called empty seeds. Predators and pathogens can damage or kill the seed while it is still in the fruit or after it is dispersed. Environmental conditions like flooding or heat can kill the seed before or during germination. The age of the seed affects its health and germination ability: since the seed has a living embryo, over time cells die and cannot be replaced. Some seeds can live for a long time before germination, while others can only survive for a short period after dispersal before they die.

Seed vigor is a measure of the quality of seed, and involves the viability of the seed, the germination percentage, germination rate, and the strength of the seedlings produced.

The germination percentage is simply the proportion of seeds that germinate from all seeds subject to the right conditions for growth. The germination rate is the length of time it takes for the seeds to germinate. Germination percentages and rates are affected by seed viability, dormancy and environmental effects that impact on the seed and seedling. In agriculture and horticulture quality seeds have high viability, measured by germination percentage plus the rate of germination. This is given as a percent of germination over a certain amount of time, 90% germination in 20 days, for example. 'Dormancy' is covered above; many plants produce seeds with varying degrees of dormancy, and different seeds from the same fruit can have different degrees of dormancy. It's possible to have seeds with no dormancy if they are dispersed right away and do not dry (if the seeds dry they go into physiological dormancy). There is great variation amongst plants and a dormant seed is still a viable seed even though the germination rate might be very low.

Environmental conditions affecting seed germination include; water, oxygen, temperature and light.

Three distinct phases of seed germination occur: water imbibition; lag phase; and radicle emergence.

In order for the seed coat to split, the embryo must imbibe (soak up water), which causes it to swell, splitting the seed coat. However, the nature of the seed coat determines how rapidly water can penetrate and subsequently initiate germination. The rate of imbibition is dependent on the permeability of the seed coat, amount of water in the environment and the area of contact the seed has to the source of water. For some seeds, imbibing too much water too quickly can kill the seed. For some seeds, once water is imbibed the germination process cannot be stopped, and drying then becomes fatal. Other seeds can imbibe and lose water a few times without causing ill effects, but drying can cause secondary dormancy.

=== Repair of DNA damage ===
During seed dormancy, often associated with unpredictable and stressful environments, DNA damage accumulates as the seeds age. In rye seeds, the reduction of DNA integrity due to damage is associated with loss of seed viability during storage. Upon germination, seeds of Vicia faba undergo DNA repair. A plant DNA ligase that is involved in repair of single- and double-strand breaks during seed germination is an important determinant of seed longevity. Also, in Arabidopsis seeds, the activities of the DNA repair enzymes Poly ADP ribose polymerases (PARP) are likely needed for successful germination. Thus DNA damages that accumulate during dormancy appear to be a problem for seed survival, and the enzymatic repair of DNA damages during germination appears to be important for seed viability.

=== Inducing germination ===
A number of different strategies are used by gardeners and horticulturists to break seed dormancy.

Scarification allows water and gases to penetrate into the seed; it includes methods to physically break the hard seed coats or soften them by chemicals, such as soaking in hot water or poking holes in the seed with a pin or rubbing them on sandpaper or cracking with a press or hammer. Sometimes fruits are harvested while the seeds are still immature and the seed coat is not fully developed and sown right away before the seed coat become impermeable. Under natural conditions, seed coats are worn down by rodents chewing on the seed, the seeds rubbing against rocks (seeds are moved by the wind or water currents), by undergoing freezing and thawing of surface water, or passing through an animal's digestive tract. In the latter case, the seed coat protects the seed from digestion, while often weakening the seed coat such that the embryo is ready to sprout when it is deposited, along with a bit of fecal matter that acts as fertilizer, far from the parent plant. Microorganisms are often effective in breaking down hard seed coats and are sometimes used by people as a treatment; the seeds are stored in a moist warm sandy medium for several months under nonsterile conditions.

Stratification, also called moist-chilling, breaks down physiological dormancy, and involves the addition of moisture to the seeds so they absorb water, and they are then subjected to a period of moist chilling to after-ripen the embryo. Sowing in late summer and fall and allowing to overwinter under cool conditions is an effective way to stratify seeds; some seeds respond more favorably to periods of oscillating temperatures which are a part of the natural environment.

Leaching or the soaking in water removes chemical inhibitors in some seeds that prevent germination. Rain and melting snow naturally accomplish this task. For seeds planted in gardens, running water is best – if soaked in a container, 12 to 24 hours of soaking is sufficient. Soaking longer, especially in stagnant water, can result in oxygen starvation and seed death. Seeds with hard seed coats can be soaked in hot water to break open the impermeable cell layers that prevent water intake.

Other methods used to assist in the germination of seeds that have dormancy include prechilling, predrying, daily alternation of temperature, light exposure, potassium nitrate, the use of plant growth regulators, such as gibberellins, cytokinins, ethylene, thiourea, sodium hypochlorite, and others. Some seeds germinate best after a fire. For some seeds, fire cracks hard seed coats, while in others, chemical dormancy is broken in reaction to the presence of smoke. Liquid smoke is often used by gardeners to assist in the germination of these species.

=== Sterile seeds ===
Seeds may be sterile for few reasons: they may have been irradiated, unpollinated, cells lived past expectancy, or bred for the purpose.

=== Evolution and origin of seeds ===
The issue of the origin of seed plants remains unsolved. However, more and more data tends to place this origin in the middle Devonian. The description in 2004 of the proto-seed Runcaria heinzelinii in the Givetian of Belgium is an indication of that ancient origin of seed-plants. As with modern ferns, most land plants before this time reproduced by sending into the air spores that would land and become whole new plants.

Taxonomists have described early "true" seeds from the upper Devonian, which probably became the theater of their true first evolutionary radiation. With this radiation came an evolution of seed size, shape, dispersal and eventually the radiation of gymnosperms and angiosperms and monocotyledons and dicotyledons. Seed plants progressively became one of the major elements of nearly all ecosystems.

=== True to the seed ===
Also called growing true, refers to plants whose seed will yield the same type of plant as the original plant. Open pollinated plants, which include heirlooms, will almost always grow true to seed if another variety does not cross-pollinate them.

== Seed microbiome ==
Microbial transmission from seed to seedling

Seeds harbor a diverse microbial community. Most of these microorganisms are transmitted from the seed to the developing seedlings.

== Economic importance ==
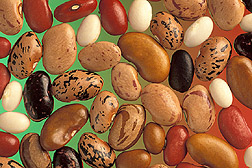
Phaseolus vulgaris (common bean or green bean) seeds are diverse in size, shape, and color.

=== Seed market ===
In the United States farmers spent $22 billion on seeds in 2018, a 35 percent increase since 2010. DowDuPont and Monsanto account for 72 percent of corn and soybean seed sales in the U.S. with the average price of a bag of GMO corn seed is priced at $270.

== Seed production ==
Seed production in natural plant populations varies widely from year to year in response to weather variables, insects and diseases, and internal cycles within the plants themselves. Over a 20-year period, for example, forests composed of loblolly pine and shortleaf pine produced from 0 to nearly 5.5 million sound pine seeds per hectare. Over this period, there were six bumper, five poor, and nine good seed crops, when evaluated for production of adequate seedlings for natural forest reproduction.

=== Edible seeds ===
Cost comparison of legumes, nuts and seeds compared to other food groups, 2021

Many seeds are edible and the majority of human calories comes from seeds, especially from cereals, legumes and nuts. Seeds also provide most cooking oils, many beverages and spices and some important food additives. In different seeds the seed embryo or the endosperm dominates and provides most of the nutrients. The storage proteins of the embryo and endosperm differ in their amino acid content and physical properties. For example, the gluten of wheat, important in providing the elastic property to bread dough is strictly an endosperm protein.

Seeds are used to propagate many crops such as cereals, legumes, forest trees, turfgrasses, and pasture grasses. Particularly in developing countries, a major constraint faced is the inadequacy of the marketing channels to get the seed to poor farmers. Thus the use of farmer-retained seed remains quite common.

Seeds are also eaten by animals (seed predation), and are also fed to livestock or provided as birdseed.

=== Poison and food safety ===
While some seeds are edible, others are harmful, poisonous or deadly. Plants and seeds often contain chemical compounds to discourage herbivores and seed predators. In some cases, these compounds simply taste bad (such as in mustard), but other compounds are toxic or break down into toxic compounds within the digestive system. Children, being smaller than adults, are more susceptible to poisoning by plants and seeds.

A deadly poison, ricin, comes from seeds of the castor bean. Reported lethal doses are anywhere from two to eight seeds, though only a few deaths have been reported when castor beans have been ingested by animals.

In addition, seeds containing amygdalin – apple, apricot, bitter almond, peach, plum, cherry, quince, and others – when consumed in sufficient amounts, may cause cyanide poisoning. Other seeds that contain poisons include annona, cotton, custard apple, datura, uncooked durian, golden chain, horse-chestnut, larkspur, locoweed, lychee, nectarine, rambutan, rosary pea, sour sop, sugar apple, wisteria, and yew. The seeds of the strychnine tree are also poisonous, containing the poison strychnine.

The seeds of many legumes, including the common bean (Phaseolus vulgaris), contain proteins called lectins which can cause gastric distress if the beans are eaten without cooking. The common bean and many others, including the soybean, also contain trypsin inhibitors which interfere with the action of the digestive enzyme trypsin. Normal cooking processes degrade lectins and trypsin inhibitors to harmless forms.

=== Other uses ===
Cotton fiber grows attached to cotton plant seeds. Other seed fibers are from kapok and milkweed.

Many important nonfood oils are extracted from seeds. Linseed oil is used in paints. Oil from jojoba and crambe are similar to whale oil.

Seeds are the source of some medicines including castor oil, tea tree oil and the quack cancer drug Laetrile.

Many seeds have been used as beads in necklaces and rosaries including Job's tears, Chinaberry, rosary pea, and castor bean. However, the latter three are also poisonous.

Other seed uses include:

- Seeds once used as weights for balances.
- Seeds used as toys by children, such as for the game Conkers.
- Resin from Clusia rosea seeds used to caulk boats.
- Nematicide from milkweed seeds.
- Cottonseed meal used as animal feed and fertilizer.

== Seed records ==
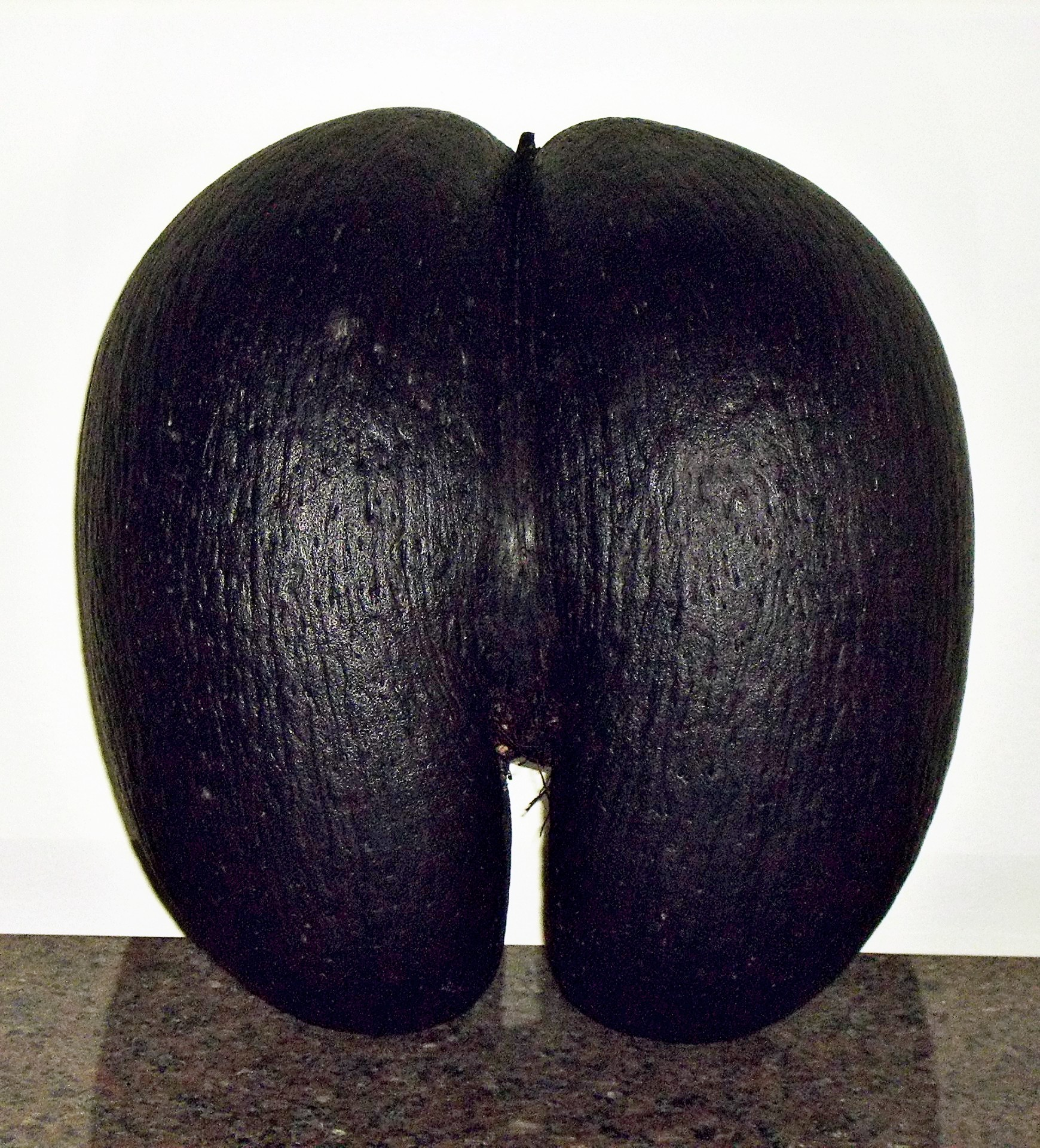
The massive fruit of the coco de mer

- The oldest viable carbon-14-dated seed that has grown into a plant was a Judean date palm seed about 2,000 years old, recovered from excavations at Herod the Great's palace on Masada in Israel. It was germinated in 2005. (A reported regeneration of Silene stenophylla (narrow-leafed campion) from material preserved for 31,800 years in the Siberian permafrost was achieved using fruit tissue, not seed.)
- The largest seed is produced by the coco de mer, or "double coconut palm", Lodoicea maldivica. The entire fruit may weigh up to 23 kilograms (50 pounds) and usually contains a single seed.
- The smallest seeds are produced by epiphytic orchids. They are only 85 micrometers long, and weigh 0.81 micrograms. They have no endosperm and contain underdeveloped embryos.
- The earliest fossil seeds are around 365 million years old from the Late Devonian of West Virginia. The seeds are preserved immature ovules of the plant Elkinsia polymorpha.

== Seed laws ==
Seed laws govern the production and marketing of seeds, for example the United Kingdom's Plant Varieties and Seeds Act 1964, and the Seed Law of the People's Republic of China, adopted in 2021. The first French law concerned with seed quality control was passed in 1905 and modern France is considered to have particularly restrictive seed legislation. In 2007, the European Union (EU) began to develop new seed legislation, intended to "improve" the rules for the marketing of seeds and plant material, while a European Court of Justice ruling in 2012 imposed restrictions on the regulation of seed sales in the EU. Laws in Kenya which restricted farmers' abilities to use their own seeds were declared unconstitutional by the High Court of Kenya in 2025, and the UK-based development charity CAFOD has suggested that the success of campaigners in Kenya has set "a positive precedent to challenge similar laws in other countries". CAFOD has also expressed criticism of the role of financial institutions, including the World Bank, who support the adoption of seed laws which embed control of the world's seeds "in the hands of a few giant corporations" instead of small-scale farmers. The charity comments that "this Kenya law has not been directly pushed by the World Bank, [but] it is part of the same "logic of profit" supported by them. Similarly, Caritas Zambia has raised concerns about the World Bank's role in supporting the adoption of Zambian legislation on seed use.

== In religion ==
The Book of Genesis in the Old Testament begins with an explanation of how all plant forms began:

And God said, Let the earth bring forth grass, the herb yielding seed, and the fruit tree yielding fruit after his kind, whose seed is in itself, upon the earth: and it was so. And the earth brought forth grass, and herb yielding seed after its kind, and the tree yielding fruit, whose seed was in itself, after its kind: and God saw that it was good. And the evening and the morning were the third day.

In the New Testament, seeds figure in several of Jesus' parables, such as his parable of a mustard seed and the story of the sower "who went out to sow".

The Quran speaks of seed germination thus:

It is Allah Who causeth the seed-grain and the date-stone to split and sprout. He causeth the living to issue from the dead, and He is the one to cause the dead to issue from the living. That is Allah: then how are ye deluded away from the truth?

== See also ==
- Biological dispersal
- Carpology
- Genetically modified crops
- List of world's largest seeds
- Recalcitrant seed
- Seed company
- Seed enhancement
- Seed library
- Seed orchard
- Seed paper
- Seed saving
- Seed testing
- Seed trap
- Seedbed
- Soil seed bank
- Selective embryo abortion

== Bibliography ==
- Embertson, Jane (1979). Pods: wildflowers and weeds in their final beauty (1st ed.). New York, New York: Macmillan Publishing Company (published 1980). p. 186. ISBN 0-684-15543-5. Archived from the original on 2025-08-13.
- Heywood, Vernon Hilton; Moore, David Moresby, eds. (1984). "Microstructural Features of Seed Surface". Current Concepts in Plant Taxonomy. Systematics Association. pp. 95–105. ISBN 978-0-12-347060-7.
- A.C. Martin. The Comparative Internal Morphology of Seeds. American Midland Naturalist Vol. 36, No. 3 (Nov., 1946), pp. 513–660
- M.B. McDonald, Francis Y. Kwong (eds.). Flower Seeds: Biology and Technology. CABI, 2005. ISBN 0-85199-906-9
- Edred John Henry Corner. The Seeds of Dicotyledons. Cambridge University Press, 1976. ISBN 0-521-20688-X
- United States Forest Service. Woody Plant Seed Manual. 1948
- Stuppy, W. Glossary of Seed and Fruit Morphological Terms. Royal botanical gardens, Kew 2004
