= Montreal melon =

Variety of fruit

'Montreal Market'
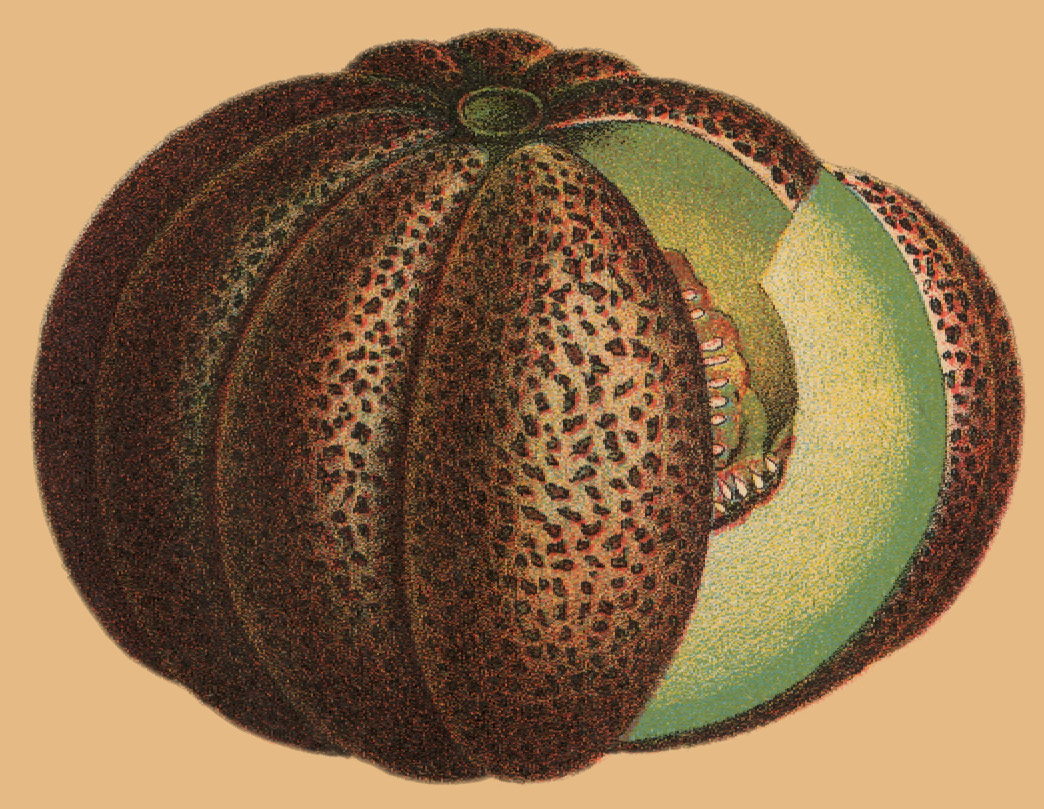
- Genus: Cucumis
- Species: C. melo
- Subspecies: Cucumis melo subsp. melo
- Cultivar: 'Montreal Market'
- Origin: Introduced by Washington Atlee Burpee, 1881

The Montreal melon, also known as the Montreal market muskmelon or the Montreal nutmeg melon (French: melon de Montréal), is a type of melon traditionally grown in the area around Montreal, Canada. It was popularised by the seed merchant W. Atlee Burpee starting in 1881 but later disappeared from large-scale cultivation. It was rediscovered in 1996 in a seed bank in Iowa.

== Description ==
The fruit is netted like a North American cantaloupe and deeply ribbed like a European cantaloupe. Its flesh is light green, almost melting in the mouth when eaten. Its spicy flavour is reminiscent of nutmeg. During its heyday, it was larger than any other melon cultivated on the continent. "The fruit is of the largest size, specimens often weighing twenty pounds and upward. The shape of this melon is almost round, flattened at both ends, and deeply ribbed, skin green and netted, flesh very thick and of finest flavour."

A report dated 1909 states that the Montreal melon is difficult to grow and varies greatly in size. "One weighing 44 pounds has been grown. The writer saw one weighing 22 pounds, which had been selected for seed purposes. Their average weight ranges from 8 to 15 pounds... The larger melons are apt to be poorer in quality than those weighing 8 to 15 pounds."

== History ==
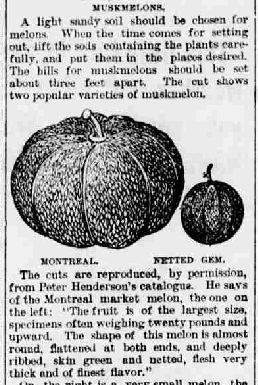
American newspaper article from 1885 about the melon, shown on the left

The Montreal melon was originally widely grown between the St. Lawrence River and Mount Royal, on the Montreal Plain. In its prime, from the late 19th century until World War II, it was one of the most popular varieties of melon on the east coast of North America.

American newspaper reports show that the melon was also grown in Vermont in the early 20th century and was found to be "exceedingly profitable" for farmers. One article lists the melons selling for about $10/dozen at wholesale and from $1.25 to $1.75 each at retail in 1907.

The melon disappeared as Montreal grew. Its delicate rind, suitable for family farms, was ill-suited to agribusiness. But after about 40 years, it was rediscovered in a seed bank maintained by the U.S. Department of Agriculture in Ames, Iowa, in 1996, and has since enjoyed a renaissance among Montreal-area gardeners.

== See also ==
- List of Canadian inventions and discoveries
- List of resurrected species
- Lazarus taxon
- De-extinction
