= Recalcitrant seed =

Plant seeds intolerant of drying or cold

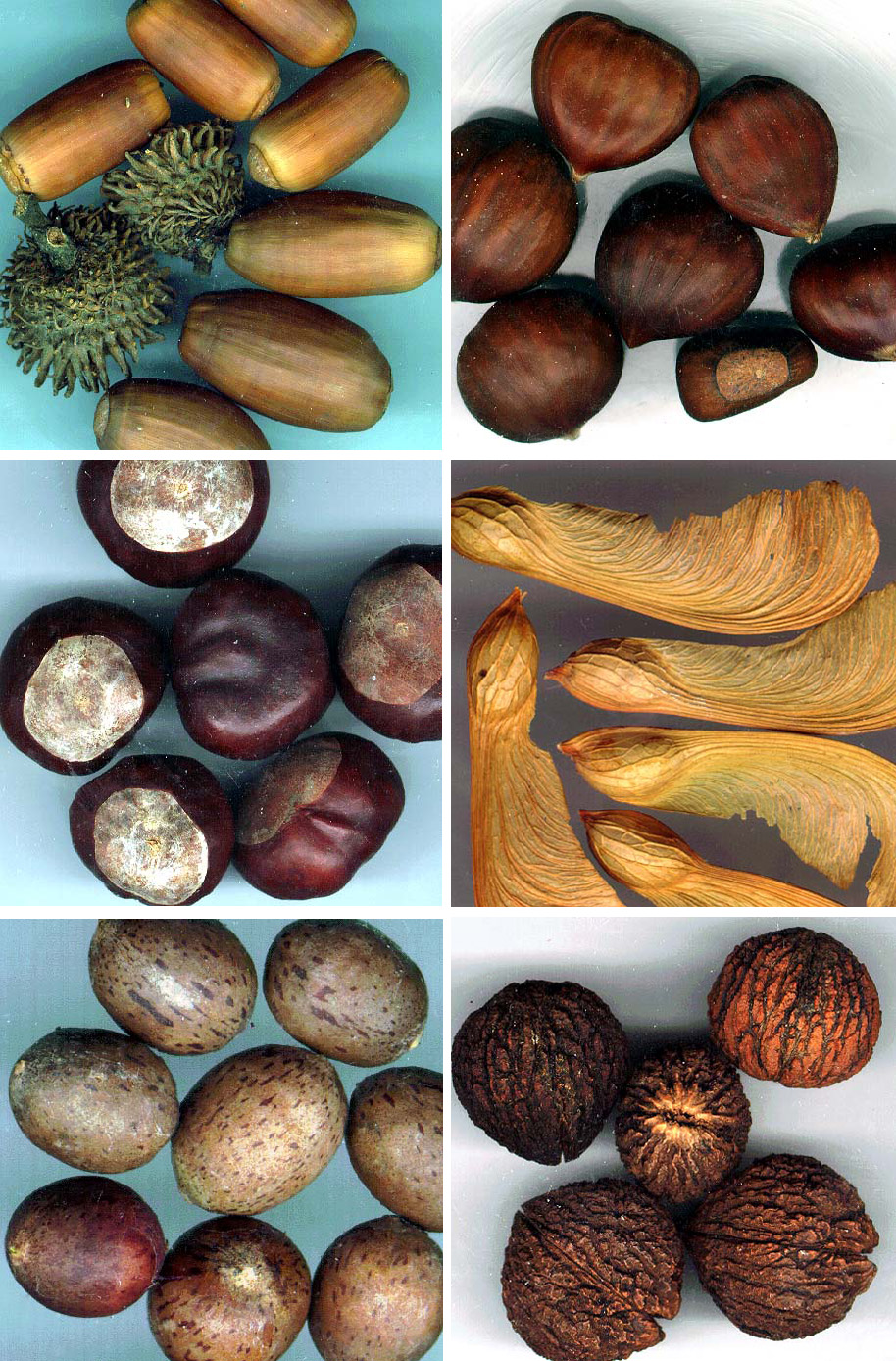
Six examples of recalcitrant species.

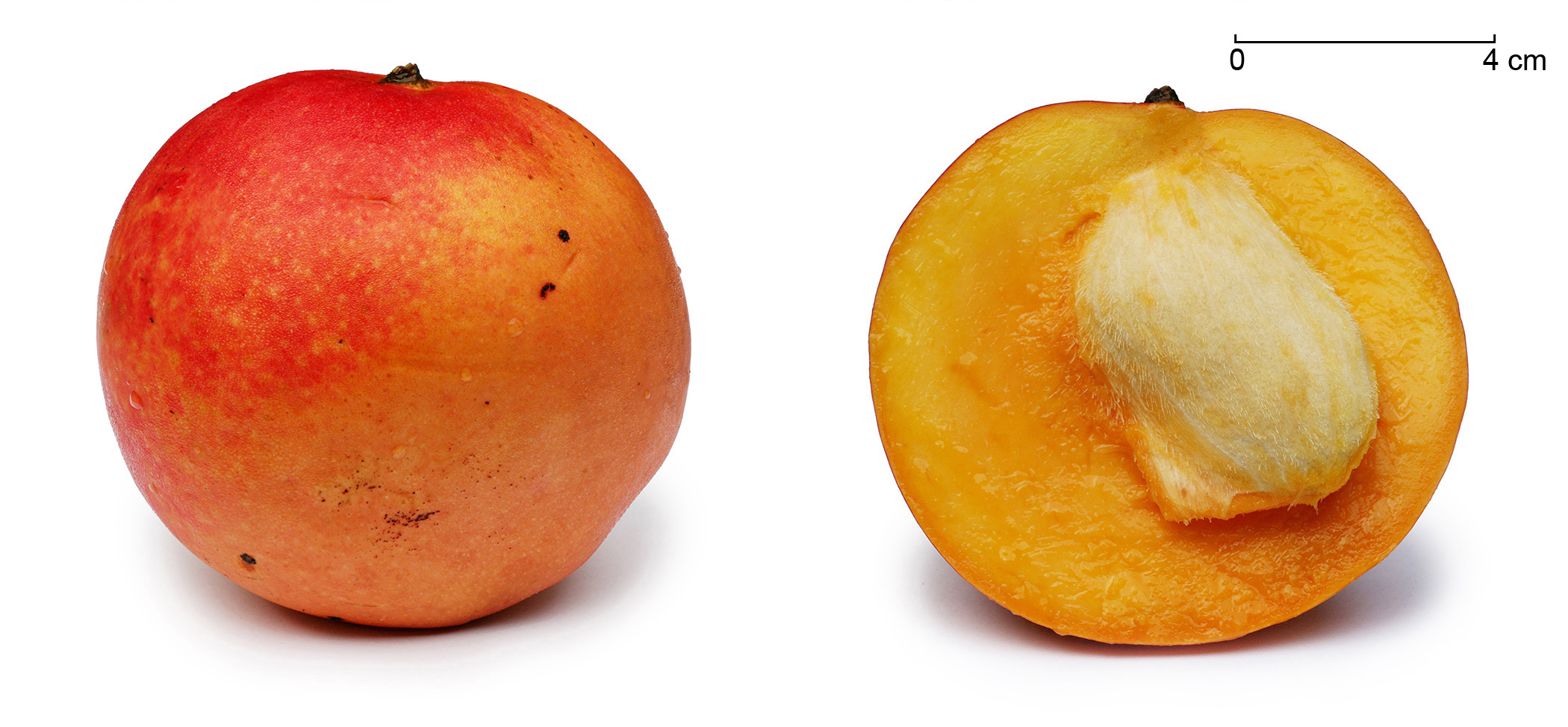
Photo of one whole and one split mango displaying its seed, which is approximately 1/3 the size of the entire fruit

Recalcitrant seeds are seeds that do not survive drying and freezing during ex situ conservation. By and large, these seeds cannot resist the effects of drying or temperatures less than 10 °C (50 °F); thus, they cannot be stored for long periods like orthodox seeds because they can lose their viability. Plants that produce recalcitrant seeds include avocado, mango, mangosteen, lychee, cocoa, rubber tree, some horticultural trees, aquatic plants such as Nymphaea caerulea, and several plants used in traditional medicine, such as species of Virola and Pentaclethra. Generally speaking, most tropical pioneer species have orthodox seeds but many climax species have recalcitrant or intermediate seeds.

== Mechanisms of damage ==
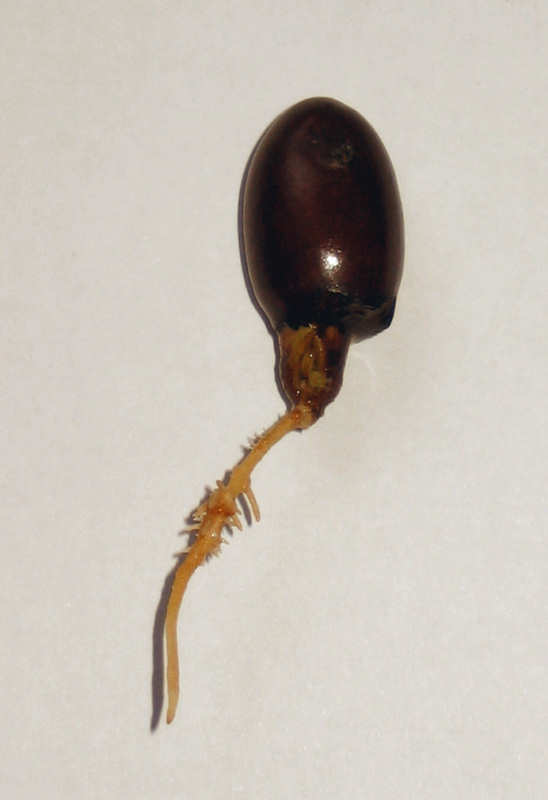
Germinating lychee seed with its radicle

The two main mechanisms causing damage to recalcitrant seeds are desiccation effects on the intracellular structures and metabolic damage from the formation of toxic chemicals such as free radicals. An example of the first type of damage would be found in some recalcitrant nontropical hardwood seeds, specifically the acorns of recalcitrant oaks, which can be stored in a non-frozen state for up to two years provided that precautions are taken against drying. These seeds show deterioration of cell membrane lipids and proteins after as few as 3–4 days of drying. Other recalcitrant seeds, such as those of the sweet chestnut (Castanea sativa), show oxidative damage resulting from uncontrolled metabolism occurring during the drying process.

== Storage ==
Preservation of recalcitrant seeds remains experimental. Some approaches include:

- Removal of the embryo inside for cryopreservation (liquid nitrogen).
- Cryopreservation of the whole seed in an anti-freezing solution.

Intermediate seeds are between orthodox and recalcitrant seeds in their survivability. They are initially identified by their inability to survive conventional dry-freezing storage while being able to survive cryopreservation as a whole. The storage guideline is to put them in refrigeration at 45–65% RH, for a maximum of five years.

== See also ==
- Micropropagation
- Orthodox seed
- Plant propagation
- Seedbank
