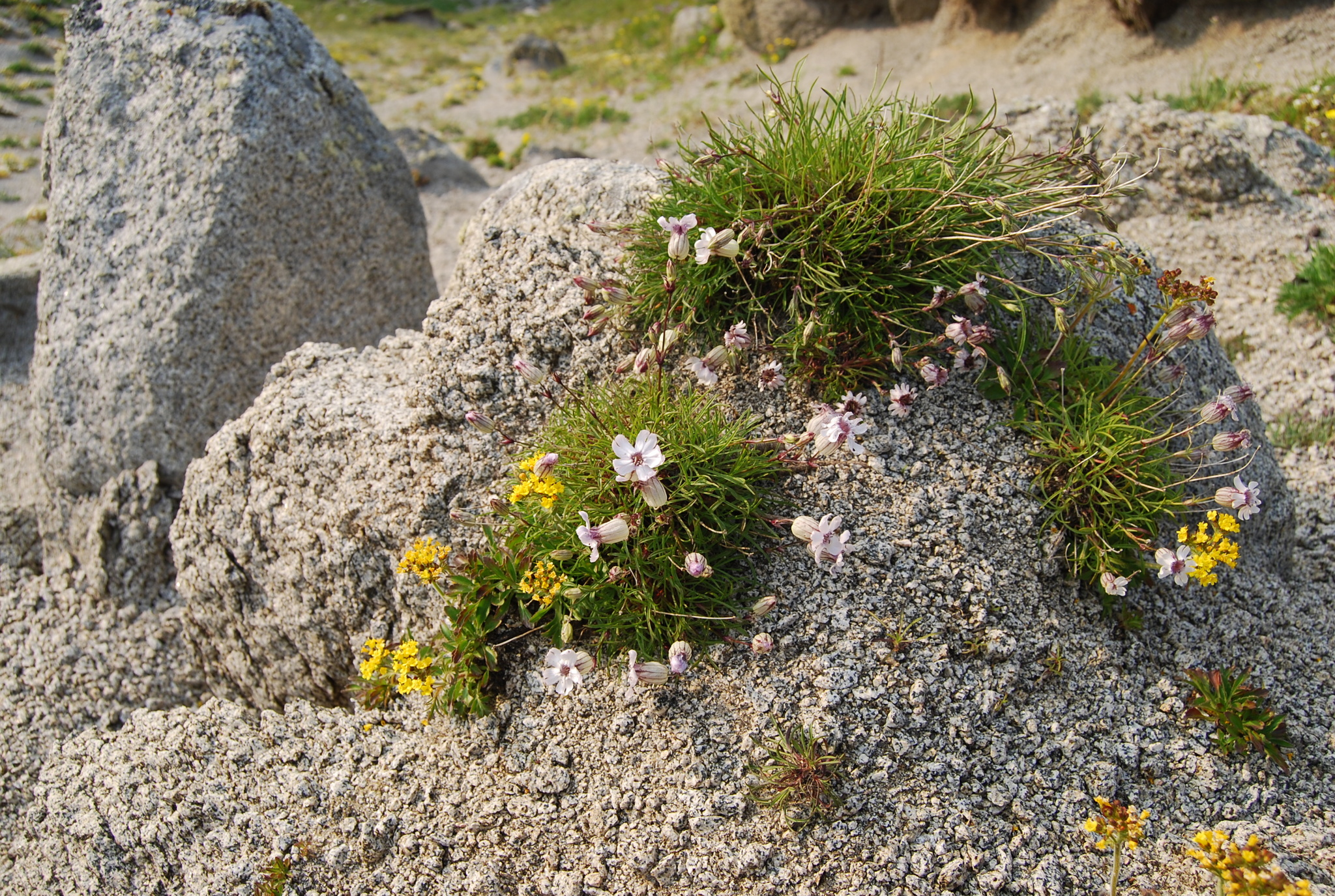
- Silene stenophylla growing in Magadan Oblast, Russia

Scientific classification
- Kingdom: Plantae
- Clade: Tracheophytes
- Clade: Angiosperms
- Clade: Eudicots
- Order: Caryophyllales
- Family: Caryophyllaceae
- Genus: Silene
- Species: S. stenophylla

Binomial name
- Silene stenophylla Ledeb. (1842)

= Silene stenophylla =

Species of flowering plant

Silene stenophylla is a species of flowering plant in the family Caryophyllaceae. Commonly called narrow-leafed campion, it is a species in the genus Silene. It grows in the Arctic tundra of far eastern Siberia and the mountains of northern Japan. Frozen samples, estimated via radiocarbon dating to be around 32,000 years old, were discovered in the same area as current living specimens and, in 2012, a team of scientists successfully regenerated a plant from the samples.

== Habitat and description ==
Silene stenophylla grows in the Arctic tundra of far eastern Siberia and the mountains of northern Japan. It is typically 5–25 cm (2–10 in) tall, has narrow leaves, and a large calyx. It blooms during the summer and has incised petals that are lilac, light pink, or white in color. It is a perennial that grows on stony cliffs and sandy shores. S. stenophylla is one of a few Beringian plant species that did not establish itself in North America.

== Etymology ==
The specific epithet is derived from the Greek stenos (narrow) and phyllon (leaf) to give "narrow-leaved".

== Recovery of frozen remains ==
A team of scientists from Russia, Hungary and the United States recovered frozen Silene stenophylla seeds and remains from the Pleistocene in 2007, while investigating about 70 ancient ground squirrel (genera Urocitellus and Geomys ssp) hibernation burrows or caches, hidden in permanently frozen loess-ice deposits located at Duvanny Yar, on the right bank of the lower Kolyma River in Sakha Republic, northeastern Siberia, in the plant's present-day range.

Using radiocarbon dating, the age of the seeds was estimated at between 20,000 and 40,000 years, dating the seeds to the Pleistocene epoch. The embryos were damaged, possibly by the animals' activity. The research team presented their findings at the Botany & Plant Biology conference in Chicago, Illinois in 2007. The burrows were found 20–40 m (66–131 ft) below the present-day surface. Usually the rodents would eat the food in their larders, but in this case a flood or other weather event buried the whole area. Since the rodents had placed the larders at the level of the permafrost, the material froze almost immediately, and did not thaw out at any time since. More than 600,000 fruits and seeds were located at the site.

The Duvanny Yar section exposes the yedoma ice complex or suite and is studied by many scientists as it represents a key strategic cross-section of Late Quaternary East Siberian stratigraphy and "an important key section for the palaeo-environmental history of the Late Pleistocene Beringia Land, the non-glaciated landmass between the Taymyr Peninsula and Alaska." Near Duvanny Yar is the Pleistocene Park, (Russian: Плейстоценовый парк), a nature reserve on the Kolyma River south of Chersky where an attempt is being made to recreate the northern subarctic steppe grassland ecosystem that flourished in the area during the Last Glacial Period.

=== Regeneration ===
In February 2012, a team of scientists from the Institute of Cell Biophysics of the Russian Academy of Sciences announced they had successfully regenerated specimens from fruit that had been frozen for 31,800 (±300) years according to their radiocarbon dating. The accomplishment surpasses the previous record for the oldest plant material brought back to life, of 2000 years set by Judean date palm (Phoenix dactylifera) seeds. The team led by David Gilichinsky used material recovered in 2007 by Stakhov et al. Gilichinsky, who for many years was head of the Geocryology Lab in the Institute for Physicochemical and Biological Problems in Soil Science at the Russian Academy of Sciences in Moscow, died in February 2012, just before the paper was published. He was recognized by the team as a "pioneer in studying microorganisms in Siberian and Antarctic permafrost, his achievement attracted scientists from all over the world to research on permafrost life systems."

Initially, the researchers attempted to germinate mature seeds recovered from the fruit. When these attempts failed, they turned to the fruit itself and were able to culture adult plants from placental tissue. The team grew 36 specimens from the tissue. The plants looked identical to modern specimens until they flowered, at which time the petals were observed to be longer and more widely spaced than modern versions of the plant. The reasons for the observed variations are not known. Seeds produced by the regenerated plants germinated at a 100% success rate, compared with 90% for modern plants.

According to Robin Probert of the Millennium Seed Bank, the demonstration is "by far the most extraordinary example of extreme longevity for material from higher plants" to date. It is not surprising to find living material this old, but is surprising that viable material could be recovered, she added. The Russian scientists speculated that the tissue cells were rich in sucrose which acted as a preservative. They also noted that DNA damage caused by gamma radiation from natural ground radioactivity at the site was unusually low for the plant material's age and is comparable to levels observed in 1300-year-old lotus (Nelumbo nucifera) seeds proven to germinate. Probert hopes that the techniques developed in the resurrection of Silene stenophylla may one day be used to resurrect extinct species. Paleontologist Grant Zazula, who has previously disproven claims of ancient regeneration, said: "This discovery raises the bar incredibly in terms of our understanding in terms of the viability of ancient life in the permafrost."

The successful regeneration of the Silene stenophylla plants was cited in 2014 as the inspiration for experiments that discovered a viable giant virus, Pithovirus sibericum, in 30,000-year-old Siberian permafrost; the virus infects amoebas.
