= Judean date palm =

Species of palm

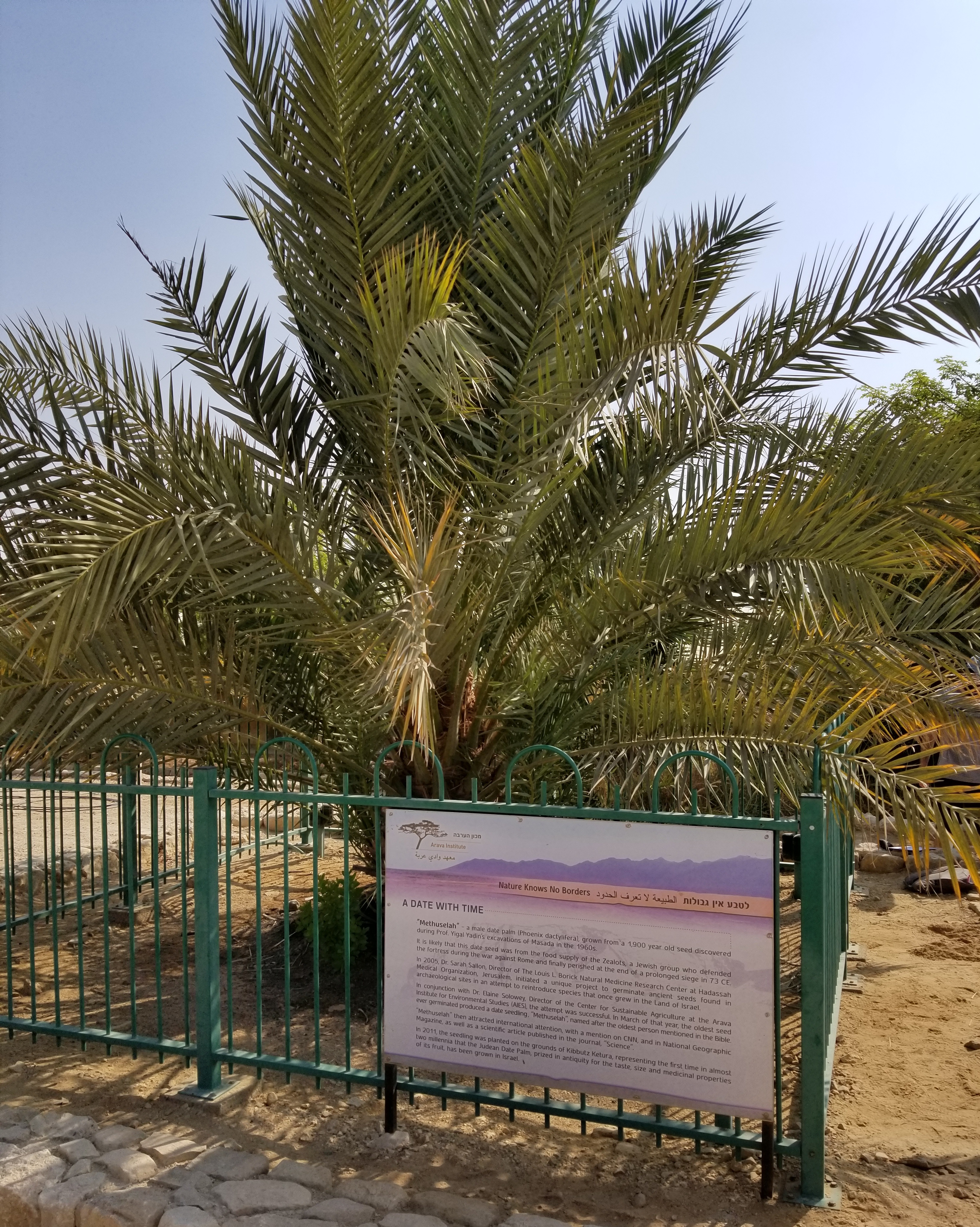
The Judean date palm at Ketura, Israel, nicknamed Methuselah

The Judean date palm is a date palm (Phoenix dactylifera) grown in the Southern Levant, in the historical region known as Judea, today part of the State of Israel and the West Bank. It is not clear whether there was ever a single distinct Judean cultivar, but dates grown in the region have had distinctive reputations for thousands of years, and the date palm was anciently regarded as a symbol of the region and its fertility. Cultivation of dates in the region almost disappeared after the 14th century AD from a combination of climate change and infrastructure decay but has been revived in modern times.

In 2005, a team of Israeli scientists sprouted a preserved 2,000-year-old seed, the oldest seed germinated with human-assistance. The palm, a male, was named Methuselah (not to be confused with a bristlecone pine tree of the same name). Following this success, six further preserved seeds were sprouted.

== History ==
In the Hebrew Bible, the fruit of the date palm was considered a staple food in the Judaean Desert, as it was a source of food and its tree of shelter and shade for thousands of years, and became a recognized symbol of the Kingdom of Judah. It grew around the Dead Sea in the south, to the Sea of Galilee and the Hula Valley regions in the north. The tree and its fruit were mentioned possibly several times indirectly, such as in Psalms 92:12–15: "The righteous himself will blossom forth as a palm tree does", and date clusters (אַשְׁכֹּלֽוֹת) are mentioned in the Song of Songs (Song of Songs 7:8).

In ancient times, date palms were used for their supposed medicinal properties to cure many diseases and infections, promoting longevity and acting as a mild aphrodisiac. Modern studies have been done in an attempt to confirm their medicinal value.

Its likeness was engraved on the shekel, the ancient Hebrew unit of currency. According to historical sources, Judean dates were renowned as tasting delicious. In the fifth century BC, Herodotus noted that the greatest importance of the Judean dates was that they were drier and less perishable than those from Egypt and thus suitable for storage and export. Pliny the Elder, a Roman naturalist of the 1st century AD, wrote that Jericho's dates were known for their succulence and sweetness, though he distinguished a considerable variety of them and discussed several different varieties by name.

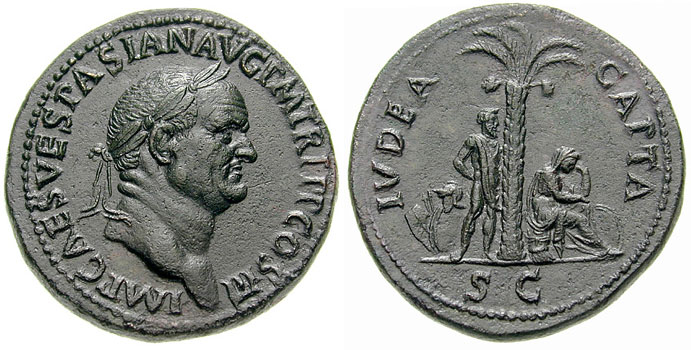
Coin of Vespasian celebrating his victory in Judaea. The legend says: IVDEA CAPTA ("Judaea [has been] captured")

When the Roman Empire suppressed the Great Revolt, thick forests of date palm up to 80 feet (24 m) high and 7 miles (11 km) wide covered the Jordan River valley from the Sea of Galilee in the north to the shores of the Dead Sea in the south. The Roman emperor Vespasian celebrated the reconquest after the First Jewish Revolt (66–70 AD) by minting Judaea Capta coinage, a series of coins sometimes depicting Judaea as a mourning woman beneath a date palm. The palm tree can appear on the coin either in combination with the mourning woman, or without her. Andrea Moresino-Zipper contests that in the former case, it is the woman who symbolises the defeated Judaea and the towering, dominating palm stands for victorious Rome, while in the latter case the palm tree does represent Judaea.

=== Decline ===
It is sometimes claimed that date growing as a commercial fruit export stopped at the end of 70 AD, when the Second Temple was destroyed by the Romans. However, study of contemporary sources indicates that the date industry continued in Judea throughout the Roman period and that the Roman Imperial treasury collected a great portion of the profits. Asaph Goor, in his 21-page article History of the Date through the Ages in the Holy Land, never mentions any such Roman devastation of the date palms, but rather cites numerous contemporary accounts attesting to the continuing extent of date cultivation through the Roman period. Goor only detects a decline in date cultivation through the period of Early Muslim peroid and especially during the Crusades, when he notes that the devastation of the region was particularly hard on the palm plantations. However, despite this, extensive cultivation persisted in Jericho and Zoara, until production ceased during the Mamluk period around the 14th century, which he attributes to a change in the climate. Goor quotes several later, Ottoman-period travellers to the area as to the rarity of date palms, including Pierre Belon, who in 1553 scoffed at the idea that the region could have ever produced the bounty of dates reported in ancient sources.

Climatological research has proven that immediately after 1000 AD, the climate became colder and more humid, reaching a peak around 1600, followed by a century of severe heat and drought, and then again by colder times with more rainfall. A 1974 study blames the 15th-century disappearance of date palms from the Jericho-Ein Gedi region on human activity, but Goor raises the possibility that the climate change led to the springs in the area delivering less water, which harmed the water-intensive cultivation of date palms.

== Germination of 2000-year-old seeds ==
=== Ancient seeds ===
During 1963–1965, excavations at Herod the Great's palace on Masada, Israel, revealed a cache of date palm seeds preserved in an ancient jar. They had experienced a very dry and sheltered environment for millennia. Radiocarbon dating at the University of Zurich confirmed the seeds dated from between 155 BC to 64 CE. The seeds were held in storage for 40 years at Bar-Ilan University, Ramat Gan.

=== Germination and growth ===
Sarah Sallon came up with the initiative to germinate some ancient seeds and persuaded the archaeological storage at the Hebrew University of Jerusalem to share some. She challenged her friend, Elaine Solowey from the Center for Sustainable Agriculture at the Arava Institute for Environmental Studies, with the task and in 2005 Solowey managed to sprout several seeds, after slowly hydrating them in a common baby bottle warmer, then pretreating them in an ordinary solution of fertilizer and growth hormone. Three of the seeds were subsequently planted at Ketura, Israel, in the Arabah in southern Israel. The first plant was nicknamed "Methuselah" after the longest-lived person listed in the Bible.

By June 2008, the tree had nearly a dozen fronds and was nearly 1.4 metres (4 ft 7 in) tall. Methuselah flowered in March 2011 and is male. By November 2011 it was 2.5 metres (8 ft 2 in) high, having been transplanted from pot to earth. By May 2015, the palm was 3.0 metres (9.8 ft) tall and was producing pollen. As of February 2020, Methuselah had reached 3.5 metres (11 ft).

=== New sprouts and pollination plans ===
As of 2012, there were tentative plans to crossbreed the male palm with what was considered its closest extant relative, the Hayani date from Egypt, to generate fruit by 2022; however, two female Judean palms have been sprouted since then. By 2015 Methuselah had produced pollen that has been used successfully to pollinate female date palms.

As of 2019, altogether thirty-two Judean date palm seeds have been grown from locations in the Dead Sea area, and six saplings have survived; Hannah from Wadi Makukh, Adam from Masada, and Jonah, Uriel, Boaz and Judith from Qumran. As of February 2020, Adam was 1.5 m (4 ft 11 in). Both Adam and Jonah have produced flowers. Because two of the seedlings are female, it is hoped that it will be possible to pollinate one or both of the female Judean date palms with pollen from Methuselah. The genomes of these Judean date palms germinated from ancient seeds were sequenced and analyzed.

As of June 2021, dates have grown from the pollination of Hannah, one of the female specimens, by Methuselah. The first harvest produced 111 dates, and the second almost 700. In regard of taste, the Zahidi dates comes closest. The harvested dates are undergoing study regarding their properties and nutritional values.

Researchers at the Arava Institute for Environmental Studies at Kibbutz Ketura plan to grow dates resurrected from seeds found at archaeological sites in the Judaean Desert and Masada in large quantities using tissue culture, and then establish them in commercial plantations.

=== Genetically related cultivars ===
Phylogenetic analysis shows that, when compared with three other cultivars of date palm, Judean date palms are most closely related to the Hayani cultivar, which originates in Egypt, compared to Medjool and Barhee cultivars. In addition to its honoured place in the history of Judea, the palm may contribute useful characteristics, such as environmental tolerance and disease resistance, to modern date cultivars.

== Jewish symbolism ==
The book Plants of the Bible by Michael Zohary states: "The Hebrew word for the date palm is 'tàmâr.' [...] It became the Jews' symbol of grace and elegance and was often bestowed by them to women." For example, David's beautiful daughter was named Tamar.

An ancient coin design depicting a date palm and two baskets full of dates has been reused for the front side of the modern Israeli ten-shekel coin.

== See also ==
- Agriculture in Israel
- Agriculture in Palestine
- Biodiversity in Israel and Palestine
- De-extinction
- Oldest viable seed
- Wildlife of Israel
- List of resurrected species
