= Enhancement =

Enhancement may refer to:

== Human body enhancement ==
- Breast enhancement, breast enlargement or contouring
- Cleavage enhancement, an increase in the definition of breast cleavage
- Contrast enhancement, enhancement of the contrast of structures or fluids within the body in medical imaging after administration of a contrast medium.
- Genetic enhancement, the use of genetic engineering to modify a person's nonpathological human traits
- Human enhancement, augmentation of the human body to increase capability
- Male enhancement, a euphemism for penis enlargement

== Image enhancement ==
- Edge enhancement, an image-processing

filter that increases the contrast of shape borders to improve its acutance (apparent sharpness)

- Image enhancement, improvement to perceived image quality
- Shadow and highlight enhancement, an image processing technique to correct exposure

== Acoustical signal enhancement ==
- Acoustic enhancement, the augmentation of direct, reflected, or reverberant sound waves without resorting to electronic sound reinforcement
- Blip enhancement, an electronic warfare technique used to fool radar
- Forensic audio enhancement, the scientific analysis and improvement of audio clarity, especially to improve intelligibility
- Orchestral enhancement, using orchestration techniques, architecture, or electronic sound reinforcement to modify the sound of a live musical performance
- Speech enhancement, the improvement of speech quality via audio signal processing

== Software enhancement ==
- Progressive enhancement, a web application design that provides a usable experience to users of a broad spectrum of web browsers, but gives additional features to users of more sophisticated web browsers
- Software enhancement, a proposed or newly added software feature
- Web enhancement, official downloadable content published via the World Wide Web for a video game

== Other uses ==
- Antibody-dependent enhancement, an increase in viral infection facilitated by the host's own antibodies
- Diamond enhancement, a treatment that improves the gemological characteristics of a natural diamond
- Hydrogen fuel enhancement, adding hydrogen to conventional hydrocarbon fuel in an attempt to improve the fuel economy and/or power output of an internal combustion engine
- Input enhancement, a technique for teaching a language to non-native speakers
- Seed enhancement, pre-sowing treatment to improve seed performance
- Self-enhancement, an overly positive self-assessment
- Sexual enhancement, sex toy

== See also ==
- Enhance (disambiguation)
