= ENF =

ENF may refer to:

- East Neuk Festival, an annual music festival
- Eclaireurs Neutres de France, a French Scouting association
- Electrical network frequency analysis
- Elks National Foundation, in the United States
- Enfield Town railway station, in London
- Enontekiö Airport, in Finland
- Europe of Nations and Freedom, a former political group in the European Parliament
- Forest Enets language
