= Enhance =

Enhance may refer to:

- Enhance Herts, an English charity
- ENHANCE International, a management consultancy
- Operations Enhance and Enhance Plus, of the Vietnam War
- USS Enhance, either of two mine warfare vessels of the U.S. Navy:
  - USS Enhance AM-437, an Aggressive-class minesweeper
  - USS Enhance (AM-228, canceled June 6, 1944; List of mine warfare vessels of the United States Navy § Minesweepers (AM)
- Enhance (game), videogame from Glitchers

== See also ==
- Enhancement (disambiguation)
- Enhancer (disambiguation)
