= 76th Maintenance Wing =

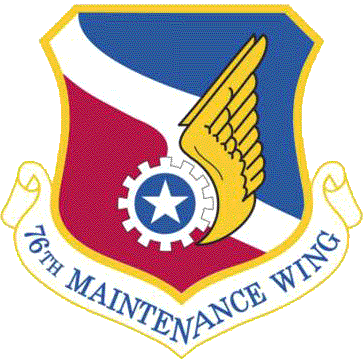
- 76th Maintenance Wing emblem
- Active: 1953–2001; 2005–2012
- Country: United States
- Branch: United States Air Force
- Role: Maintenance support
- Part of: Air Force Materiel Command
- Decorations: Air Force Outstanding Unit Award

The 76th Maintenance Wing was a wing of the United States Air Force located at Tinker Air Force Base, Oklahoma. Its former components transferred to the Oklahoma City Air Logistics Complex.

== History ==
On 1 August 1953, the 2851st Air Base Wing was designated and organized to provide administrative services for Air Force logistics in San Antonio, Texas. It was redesignated the 2851st Air Base Group on 16 October 1964.

Nearly thirty years later, it was

- redesignated the 651st Support Group on 1 October 1992;
- redesignated the 651st Air Base Group on 1 October 1993;
- and redesignated the 76th Air Base Wing on 1 October 1994.

The 2851st Air Base Wing provided administrative and logistical support for the San Antonio Air Materiel Area (later, San Antonio Air Logistics Center) and numerous tenant organizations on the base. It became host wing of Kelly Air Force Base on 17 August 1959. It was reduced to group status from 1964 to 1994. The wing and group frequently supported humanitarian and disaster relief missions and deployed personnel in support of operations in Southwest Asia in 1990 and 1991.

On 1 October 2012, the Oklahoma City Air Logistics Center was redesignated as the Oklahoma City Air Logistics Complex, and leadership of the complex was transferred from the former 76th Maintenance Wing.

== Lineage ==
- Designated as the 2851st Air Base Wing and organized on 1 August 1953

Redesignated 2851st Air Base Group on 16 October 1964
Redesignated 651st Support Group on 1 October 1992
Redesignated 651st Air Base Group on 1 October 1993
Redesignated 76th Air Base Wing on 1 October 1994
Inactivated on 30 May 2001

- Redesignated 76th Maintenance Wing

Activated on 18 February 2005
Inactivated on 1 October 2012

=== Assignments ===
- San Antonio Air Materiel Area (later San Antonio Air Logistics Center): 1 August 1953 – 30 May 2001
- Oklahoma City Air Logistics Center: 18 February 2005 – 1 October 2012 (attached to Air Force Sustainment Center after 10 July 2012)

=== Components 2005-2012 ===
- 76th Aircraft Maintenance Group
- 76th Propulsion Maintenance Group
- 76th Commodities Maintenance Group
- 76th Software Maintenance Group - The group is a major software development and production organizations for the United States Air Force. Personnel provide expert software support for the B-1, B-2, B-52 and E-3 aircraft. In addition, the group provides software maintenance for all cruise missiles. In support of the depot mission and warfighter shops, the group provides software design and maintenance for all assigned engines and a variety of individual components and systems.
- 76th Maintenance Support Group

=== Stations ===
- Kelly Air Force Base, Texas, 1 August 1953 – 30 May 2001
- Tinker Air Force Base, Oklahoma, 18 February 2005 - 1 October 2012
