= ENH =

ENH or enh may refer to:

- Evanston Northwestern Healthcare, former name of an integrated healthcare delivery system in Illinois, US
- Enshi Xujiaping Airport (IATA code), China
- Tundra Enets language (ISO 639-3 code: enh)
- Enhanced, a convective outlook of the Storm Prediction Center
- The national hydrocarbon company of Mozambique, Empresa Nacional de Hidrocarbonetos

== See also ==
- Enhance (disambiguation)
