= San Antonio Air Logistics Center =

Former air depot of the US Air Force in San Antonio, TX

Coordinates: 29.3941°N 98.5718°W

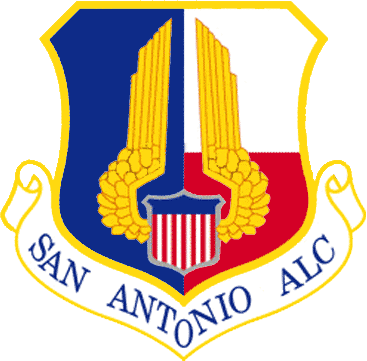
San Antonio Air Logistics Center - Emblem

The San Antonio Air Logistics Center is a former air depot of the United States Air Force located alongside Kelly Air Force Base. It traced its history to the creation of the San Antonio Air Depot Area Command in the 1940s. Kelly's World War II mission turned the base into a huge industrial complex. It was closed as part of the 1995 Base Realignment and Closure Commission.

== Creation of San Antonio Air Service Command ==
The San Antonio Air Service Command (former Air Depot Area Command), managed the increased supply and maintenance workload. Kelly workers overhauled, repaired, and modified aircraft, engines, and related equipment.

The maintenance shops worked on thousands of Army Air Forces aircraft, including Boeing B-17 Flying Fortresses, North American B-25 Mitchells, Boeing B-29s, P-51s, and Douglas C-47 cargo aircraft. Rapid production lines established a rate of overhaul on accessories, bombsights, guns, and electrical equipment that set records for both military and commercial repair agencies.

On 1 June 1943, the 66th Service Group at Santa Maria Army Air Field, Ca., came under the San Antonio ASC.

By 1944, the command's workforce had grown tremendously. In 1939, old Duncan Field had 1,100 civilian employees and only 10 military personnel. By 1945, over 15,000 civilians and 16,000 military worked at Kelly. During World War II, nearly 40 percent of the workers at the field were women. "Kelly Katies" were the Kelly counterparts to "Rosie the Riveters", women everywhere who did non-traditional work, contributing greatly to the successful war effort. They worked in nearly every shop at Kelly, including engine overhaul.

Because of the need for more storage space, the base annexed Normoyle Ordnance Depot, later known as East Kelly, in 1945. An out-processing center for the thousands of soldiers who had received their discharges was also located at Normoyle.

The 564th Air Service Group was formed at Stinson Field, Texas, under the control of the San Antonio ASC, on 5 December 1944.

On 3 November 1945, the 1 Signal Radio Maintenance Team, Aviation, arrived at Kelly Field from Robins Field, GA., remaining under the direct authority of Air Technical Service Command. The Team was transferred to the now-SAAMA on 16 October 1948, and was then relocated to Griffiss Air Force Base, NY, on 12 August 1950.

After the end of the war, more and more AT-6, P-51, and B-29 aircraft were delivered to Kelly Field for maintenance and storage. Disposal and aircraft storage programs took up more and more of the air service command's time and space. Maintenance workers stopped repairing bombers and began supporting the occupational forces in Europe and Japan with air transportation, communications, and weather systems. In 1946, the San Antonio Air Technical Services Command became the San Antonio Air Materiel Area (SAAMA).

=== 1950s ===
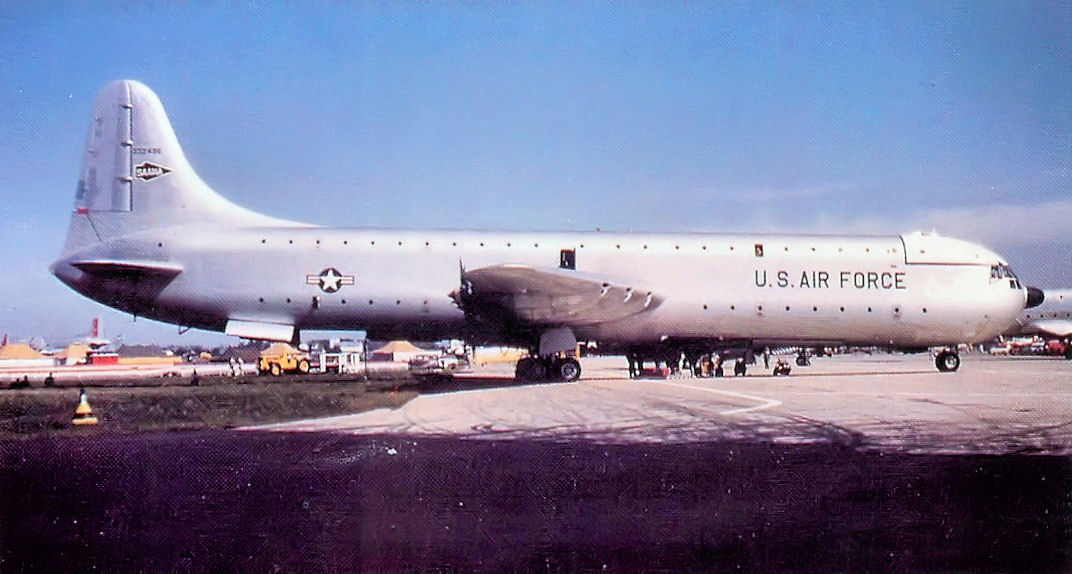
Convair XC-99 attached to the MATS 1700th Air Transport Group, Kelly AFB, Texas, 1954. Note San Antonio Air Materiel Area (SAAMA) tail marking, indicating the aircraft was assigned to the Air Materiel Command.

As the Air Force moved through its first decade of independence, its aircraft, engines, accessories, and support equipment became increasingly sophisticated and complex. These requirements meant use of new technologies and innovative programs to meet the new challenges.

On 1 August 1953 the 2851st Air Base Wing was designated and organized to provide administrative services for the logistics activities.

On 16 June 1958, prime maintenance responsibility for all items within the Air Force's Nuclear Weapons Program were assigned to SAAMA. The Directorate of Special Weapons remains the only logistical nuclear ordnance manager in the Air Force. It managed all Air Force nuclear weapon equipment such as missile re-entry systems, warheads, bomb arming and fusing devices, tools, and tests handling and training equipment.

The center repaired and overhauled B-52s for over 30 years. In the early 1960s, the B-52 Stratofortress was the major depot-level maintenance workload for SAAMA. Modifications to the B-52s performed at Kelly increased the load capability of each plane and increased the aircraft's range. In addition, the San Antonio shops camouflage-painted the B-52Gs for Southeast Asia Arc Light operations. This era in Kelly's history ended when the Air Force shifted the B-52 workload to Oklahoma City AMA at Tinker AFB in the spring of 1993. The 36-year-old relationship between Kelly and the big bomber was the longest association between any Air Force weapons system and a single ALC to that point.

In August 1962, SAAMA "loaned" the National Aeronautics and Space Administration (NASA) six aircraft - two F-102s, two TF102s and two T33s - so the astronauts at Houston's Manned Spacecraft Center could maintain their flying proficiency. Two years later, Directorate of Maintenance workers built three Apollo capsule trainers for NASA. And Kelly's Directorate of Aerospace Fuels supplied NASA with the required liquid propellants from the very beginning of the Space Administration's push into space.

=== Vietnam War ===
Kelly's workload remained relatively stable until the mid-1960s, when American efforts to prevent the fall of the South Vietnamese government led to direct American involvement. Following the Gulf of Tonkin incident in August 1964, all air materiel areas began supporting Southeast Asia on a 24-hour basis. By 31 December 1965, SAAMA had sent 11 supply teams, totaling 89 personnel, on temporary duty to Southeast Asia to establish supply centers throughout the western Pacific, including South Vietnam.

Kelly also sent maintenance teams to Southeast Asia. Those who remained in San Antonio also strove to meet the demands for materiel and aircraft maintenance.

On 1 July 1965, Kelly opened as an aerial port of embarkation to provide though-plane cargo service to Southeast Asia. Kelly Air Force Base personnel processed and routed vital war material earmarked for South Vietnam to the Southeast Asian Theater. By 1967, the pace of the United States build-up intensified. The Lockheed C-141 Starlifter cargo aircraft began to enter the Air Force inventory in sufficient numbers to replace the aging C-124 Globemaster II. With air terminal modernization and the increased use of C-141 aircraft, Military Airlift Command (MAC) aircrews seldom experienced any delays at Kelly's aerial port.

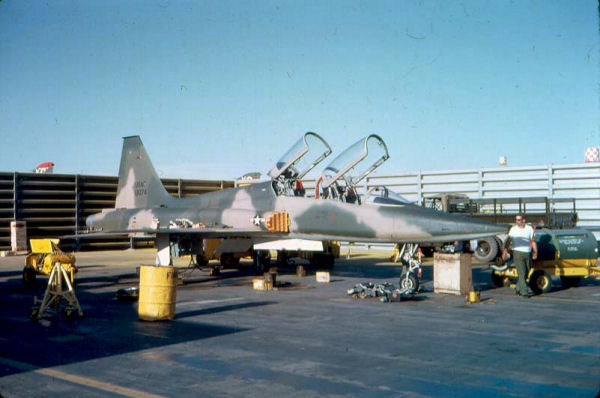
Northrop F-5B Freedom Fighter (s/n 65-13074) of the 602th Fighter Squadron at Bien Hoa Air Base, South Vietnam, in 1966. It was part of the project "Skoshi Tiger" to evaluate the F-5.

On 1 November 1965, SAAMA assumed responsibility for the Air Force's entire watercraft program. This included all landing-type vessels, spares, engines, and combat ships. Other items included cargo tanks, special service vessels, barges, small craft, dredges, rigging, and marine hardware. Earlier that year, on 3 August, Kelly became responsible for assembly and shipment of the necessary airfield lighting equipment to establish four semi-fixed installations in Southeast Asia.

In August 1966, the Air Force Logistics Command established PROJECT LOGGY SORT (LOGGY-Specialize Overseas Repair Test) to study the requirements for repair and maintenance of United States Air Force tactical aircraft in a combat environment in Southeast Asia. The goal was to provide tactical fighter units with greater mobility and flexibility. The F-4C Phantom II aircraft was selected as the test vehicle because it was the most modern system in existence and best represented planned future weapon systems. SAAMA, as manager for the F-4s aerospace ground equipment, accumulated, analyzed and established base level repair restrictions on the items.

Weapon systems used in Southeast Asia managed by SAAMA included F-102 Delta Dagger, F-106 Delta Dart, A-37 Dragonfly, O-2 Skymaster, and F-5 Freedom Fighter aircraft, while the major maintenance workloads centered around aircraft engines, airfield lighting equipment, life support system items, aerospace ground equipment, and fuels. Specific maintenance workloads were B-52 aircraft modifications such as the T34, T-56 and J79 engine overhaul and recoverable-aerospace item repair.

The early 1970s witnessed the establishment of the Vietnamization Program, also known as the Nixon Doctrine. This new policy was crucial to reducing the United States Department of Defense footprint in South Vietnam - especially from the Army and Air Force. As part of this effort, SAAMA personnel were deeply involved in the planning and construction of an engine facility at Bien Hoa Air Base. This assignment began in February 1971 when the Air Force Logistics Command gave the SAAMA the responsibility for developing complete plans and specifications for converting an existing building at Bien Hoa Air Base into an engine overhaul facility.

One month later, the San Antonio Air Materiel Area became involved with yet another project to provide logistics support. On 20 October 1972, SAAMA began its part in Project Enhance Plus, to transfer A-37, F-5E Tiger II, and T-38 Talon aircraft, engines, and support spares to the Republic of Vietnam to carry on the war after American withdrawal. Nearly every directorate at Kelly contributed to this effort.

The San Antonio Air Materiel Area set several records during this period. In addition to the transfer of A-37s, F-5s, and T-38s, over 18.3 million pounds of cargo were sent on 232 missions using C-141, C-5 Galaxy, Boeing 707 and Douglas DC-8 aircraft. Air Force Headquarters congratulated all concerned for their support in this project. They said it was proud of the ability shown by all air logistics centers and other activities to get the job done in spite of the critical time, worldwide scope of the operation, and the many actions which had to be completed.

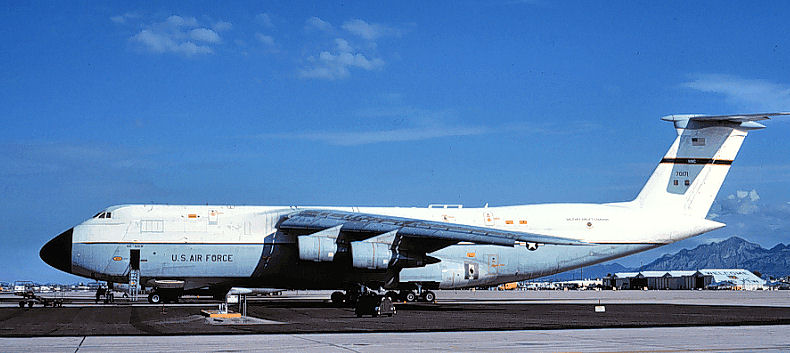
C-5A Galaxy in the 1970s

The C-5A Galaxy, the world's largest aircraft, entered the Air Force inventory on 8 June 1970. San Antonio Air Materiel Area had both management and repair responsibility for the giant transport and its TF39 engine. Weighing about 350 tons, the aircraft can transport 98 percent of equipment issued to an Army division, including the 100,000 pound M-1 tank, self-propelled artillery equipment, missiles, and helicopters. On its initial visit to Kelly on 31 January 1970, prominent figures as well as public spectators greeted the C-5A.

=== Post-Vietnam era ===
In 1974, San Antonio Air Materiel Area changed its name to the San Antonio Air Logistics Center, but the dedication and support to the Air Force mission remained the same.

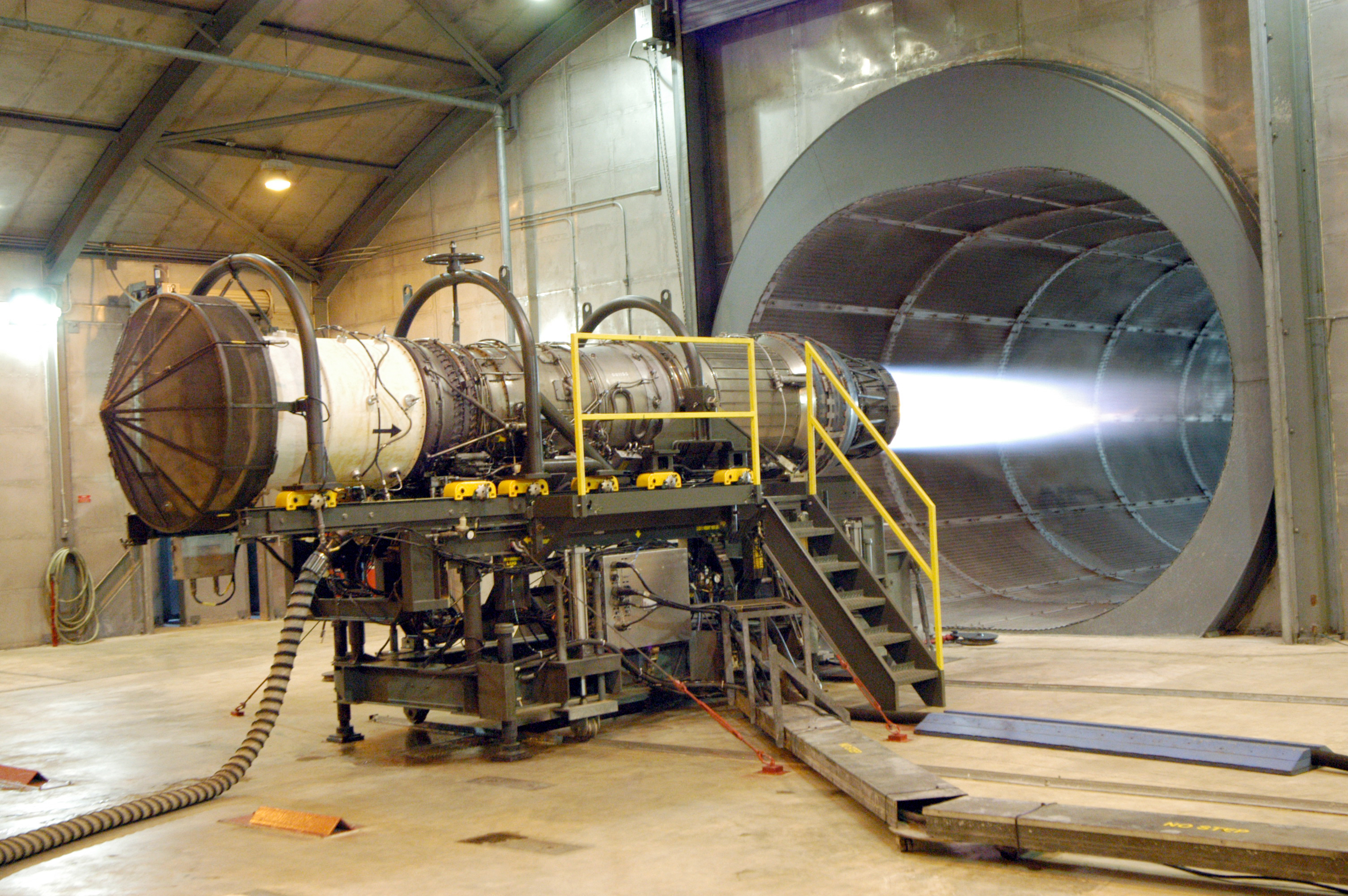
Pratt & Whitney F100 turbofan engine

The F100 engine became a major engine workload for Kelly in the late 1970s as F-16 Fighting Falcons and F-15 Eagles entered the Air Force inventory in increasing numbers. Air Force officials predicted the F100 to be Kelly's largest overhaul workload since the Pratt and Whitney R4360 engine, which dominated overhaul activities at the base for more than a decade. The San Antonio Air Materiel Area was designated as the Specialized Repair Activity for the F100 in 1969.

=== Closure ===
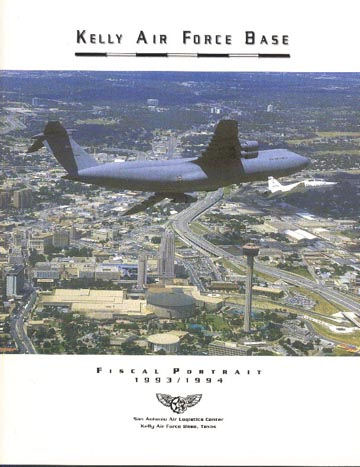
Kelly AFB document, 1993

During Operation Just Cause, Kelly served as a transit point for more than 8,200 troops deploying to Panama and as a reception site for some 250 incoming wounded service members. Later, the base moved more than 10,000 short tons of material and 4,700 passengers and deployed 17 million pounds of munitions to Southwest Asia for Operation Desert Storm. During the 1990s, it supported US operations in Kosovo.

In 1992, a major defense reorganization had shifted ownership of most of Kelly's warehouse space from the Air Force to the new Defense Logistics Agency. The following year, the Base Realignment and Closure Commission added Kelly and three other logistics centers to the list of installations marked for closure. Local officials convinced the commissioners to spare the base, but it was only a temporary stay.

Kelly Air Force Base was closed because the 1995 Base Realignment and Closure Commission decided the base's workload should be consolidated with that of other Air Force depots. At the same time McClellan Air Force Base in Sacramento, California, was also closed. Instead of shifting all workloads, some were outsourced or privatized by the Clinton administration. Parts of the installation were shifted to Lackland Air Force Base, with a significant portion becoming Port San Antonio.

== Present use ==
1,873 acres (7.58 km^{2}) of land, including hangars and industrial facilities previously known as the San Antonio Air Logistics Center, is operated by the Greater Kelly Development Authority (a political subdivision of the State of Texas, now renamed the Port Authority of San Antonio) as the Port San Antonio business park. As of 2006, there are still some isolated USAF activities on Port San Antonio subordinate to Lackland, as well as a substantial tract of military family housing.

Port San Antonio (formerly known as KellyUSA) has now renamed the logistics center Port San Antonio in line with its business strategy of becoming the largest inland port in South Texas.

== Major Commands ==
- Gulf Coast Army Air Forces Training Center, 1 May 1942
- Air Service Command, 11 March 1943
- Army Air Forces Materiel and Services Command, 17 Jul 1944

Re-designated: Army Air Forces Technical Service Command 31 Aug 1944

- Air Technical Service Command, 1 July 1945
- Air Materiel Command, 9 March 1946
- Air Force Logistics Command, 1 April 1961
- Air Materiel Command, 1 June 1992 – 30 September 2001

== Designations ==
- San Antonio Air Intermediate Depot

Re-designated: San Antonio Air Depot
Re-designated: San Antonio Air Force Depot, 14 January 1921 – 3 January 1955

- San Antonio Air Depot Area Command

Re-designated: San Antonio Air Service Command
Re-designated: San Antonio Air Technical Service Command
Re-designated: San Antonio Air Materiel Area, 1946
Re-designated: San Antonio Air Logistics Center, 1974-30 September 2001
