= Orchestral enhancement =

Orchestral enhancement is the technique of using orchestration techniques, architectural modifications, or electronic technologies to modify the sound, complexity, or color of a musical theatre, ballet or opera pit orchestra. Orchestral enhancements are used both to create new sounds and to add capabilities to existing orchestral ensembles.

Adding additional instruments to a pit orchestra is a long-practiced technique used to obtain a fuller, richer sound. Starting in the 1970s, instruments in musical theatre were amplified with sound reinforcement systems. In the 1980s, the introduction of electronic synthesizers, sequencers and prerecorded music tracks was initially greeted with fear by musicians' unions and performers. However, rather than entirely replacing traditional orchestra pit instruments, these technologies are often used alongside the "live" violin players, wind instrumentalists, and rhythm section members.

== Role ==
Orchestral enhancement systems should be able to realistically simulate the sound of the missing instruments by using prerecorded, sampled, synthesized, or sequenced sounds, store multiple productions in some sort of score format, such as a sequencer file or computer program, and vary the tempo.

As well, orchestral enhancement systems need to be able to make "live" adjustments to deal with forgotten lines or onstage mishaps, and transpose the key of the piece or its subsections. The system should also allow the conductor to make changes to the mix or levels of the different instrument sounds in real time.

== Approaches ==
=== Adding instruments ===
Adding additional instruments is a long-practiced orchestral enhancement technique. The simplest type of adding additional instruments is to add performers of an instrument which already exists in the score. For example, a musical theatre conductor may add violins to obtain a "lusher" or fuller string tone. Similarly, a conductor may add rhythm section instruments, such as additional chordal instruments (e.g., Hammond organ, synthesizer, acoustic guitar) or, for a piece scored for drumset, additional percussionists could be used.

A more complex form of adding instruments is to add instruments which are not specified in the score, which requires an orchestrator or arranger to score the parts. For example, if a music director wished to add a blues-style horn section of saxophones and trumpet to a music theatre pit orchestra, a jazz or blues arranger would have to arrange idiomatically appropriate parts for the section.

=== Architectural modifications ===
The sound of a pit orchestra can also be modified by making architectural modifications. Some architectural modifications such as the addition of drapery or plush fabric bunting are used to reduce unwanted reverberation in the hall. Other modifications, such as the installation of acrylic glass screens, can be used to reduce the volume of loud instruments such as trumpets, cymbals, a drum set, or an electric guitar amplifier.

In some cases, architectural modifications are used to strengthen the tone of the orchestra. The double basses may be placed on hollow wooden risers, so that the low vibrations of the instruments will be able to better resonate, or a dropped ceiling may be installed over some instrument sections, to better direct the sound outwards towards the audience. In other cases, an overhanging proscenium arch or drape, which is "trapping" sound, may be removed.

In some older music theatres, though, it may be difficult to make permanent architectural modifications, because the theatre has been designated a historical site. While this may make the removal of proscenium arches or wood panelling impossible, the use of semi-permanent additions (e.g., acrylic glass) may still be permitted.

=== Sound reinforcement ===
==== Standard amplification ====
Since the 1960s, music theatre companies have reinforced the sound of the orchestra by placing microphones on instruments and amplifying them through a public address system. While this results in a louder sound, it may not correctly reproduce the ensemble sound and instrument tone. Without the use of high-quality microphones and equalization by skilled audio engineers, amplified orchestral instruments may not sound natural when they are amplified. Without high-quality condenser microphones and correct placement, violins can sound "scratchy" and thin, and double reed wind instruments may sound excessively nasal.

One of the problems with the use of standard public address systems in music theatre is that the front-of-house and monitor speakers may obstruct audience sight lines and interfere with the stage appearance. In some cases, this problem can be solved by hiding large speakers behind set constructions or drapes. In productions with little or no onstage set structures, such as a minimalist modern piece, sound engineers may opt to use higher-cost low-profile speakers, which are slimmer. Alternatively, sound engineers may decide to "fly" the speakers by attaching them securely to the rigging above the stage using steel cables.

==== Acoustic enhancement ====
Since the 1980s, some opera companies have been experimenting with acoustic enhancement, a subtle type of sound reinforcement system. Acoustic enhancement systems help to give a more even sound in the concert hall and prevent "dead spots" in the audience seating area. Acoustic enhancement systems use "...an array of microphones connected to a computer" which processes the sound and directs it to an array of amplifiers and loudspeakers spread out in the concert hall. The computer processor is designed to augment the natural acoustics in the hall and prevent "dead spots." However, as concertgoers have become aware of the use of these systems, debates have arisen, because "...purists maintain that the natural acoustic sound of [Classical] voices [or] instruments in a given hall should not be altered."

=== Pre-recorded music ===
As a budget-saving measure, some musical theatre companies use prerecorded music tracks called click tracks. Although these recordings are able to provide a warm, convincing sound, the tempo is fixed, and the musical director must follow the prerecorded music's tempo.

Since the 1990s, prerecorded music tracks have often been replaced by electronic sequencing devices. There are many computer programs which are designed to take advantage of the MIDI (Musical Instrument Digital Interface) specifications to control multiple synthesizer parts. In effect, these devices can store "performances" and then play back these performances. Sequencers are powerful tools which are capable of realistic simulations of the orchestra. However, these devices were designed for and mostly used in the studio environment.

The first Broadway musical to use a pre-recorded soundtrack with a few live musicians accompanying it was Priscilla, Queen of the Desert in May 2011; the producer claimed to be seeking a synthetic, cheesy sound.

=== Synthesizers ===
Synthesizers are used in many musical theatre productions, either to create new, modern synthesizer tones, or to simulate orchestral instruments with sampled or synthesized tones. The most common solution used has been to place one or more synthesizer players in the orchestra, each covering multiple parts.

Although the use of synthesizer performers to substitute for orchestral instruments is a more flexible approach than using prerecorded music (in that the synthesizer players can follow the tempo of the conductor), high-quality synthesizers and samples must be used to obtain a fairly convincing tone. With an inexpensive synthesizer, the orchestral instrument sounds are often thin-sounding and artificial.

Even with a high-quality digital sampler, the resulting sounds will not contain the complex nuances of a live orchestral performer. To obtain more authentic articulations and nuances from sampled or synthesized brass or woodwind sounds, these sounds can be performed using MIDI wind controllers rather than piano-style keyboards. Wind controllers can sense a musicians' embouchure, breath pressure, and other factors, and then this input can be "translated" by the synthesizer into the nuances that are expected in a traditional woodwind or brass instrument.

Other electronic instruments include software-based instruments, which are used with computerized music systems, and custom-made MIDI controllers which respond to movements by the onstage performers. The latter technologies have been used by some experimental modern dance companies to control both synthesizers and lighting effects, so that sounds and light will be triggered by the movements of the onstage dancers.
