= Enhancer =

Enhancer may refer to:

- Enhancer (genetics), a short region of DNA that can increase transcription of a gene
- Exciter (effect), audio effect unit

== See also ==
- Enhance (disambiguation)
