= VRAS =

The Variable Room Acoustics System (VRAS) is an acoustic enhancement system for controlling room acoustics electronically. Such systems are increasingly being used to provide variable acoustics for multipurpose venues.

VRAS uses multiple microphones distributed around the room, fed via a multichannel digital reverberator to multiple loudspeakers to provide controllable enhancement of the reverberation time of the room. It is an example of a non-in-line or regenerative sound system which uses the inherent feedback of sound from the loudspeakers to the microphones to enhance the reverberation time for all sound source positions within the room. VRAS uses a unitary reverberator which maintains a constant power gain with frequency so that its inclusion does not affect the stability of the system (at each frequency, the reverberator is a unitary matrix).

In addition, VRAS uses a number of microphones close to the stage area to detect early energy from the performers, which is used to generate early reflections. Such systems are termed in-line or non-regenerative. In-line systems aim to minimise the effects of regeneration by detecting stage sound at a high level, and may then be used to generate early reflections or late reverberation.

VRAS is thus a hybrid system that uses both regenerative and non-regenerative approaches.

VRAS was developed by Mark Poletti at Industrial Research Limited,, New Zealand and commercialized by LCS Audio. VRAS is now a part of the Meyer Sound Laboratories Constellation system.

== See also ==
- Architectural acoustics
- Reverberation
- Room acoustics

== Technical Papers ==
- Poletti MA (1993). "On controlling the apparent absorption and volume in assisted reverberation systems". Acta Acustica. 78: 61–73.
- Poletti MA (1994). "The performance of a new assisted reverberation system". Acta Acustica. 2: 511–524.
- Poletti MA (July–August 1998). "The analysis of a general assisted reverberation system". Acta Acustica. 84: 766–775.
- Poletti MA (November–December 1998). "The statistics of single channel electroacoustic systems". Acta Acustica. 84: 1077–1082.
- Poletti MA (2000). "The stability of single and multichannel sound systems". Acustica-Acta Acustica. 86: 123–178.
- Poletti MA (2001). "Direct and reverberant power analysis of multichannel systems". Acta Acustica. 87: 531–541.
- Poletti MA (August 2004). "The stability of multichannel sound systems with frequency shifting". Journal of the Acoustical Society of America. 116 (2): 853–871. Bibcode:2004ASAJ..116..853P. doi:10.1121/1.1763972.
- M. A. Poletti, “An assisted reverberation system for controlling apparent room absorption and volume,” 101st convention of the Audio Engineering Society, Los Angeles, November 8–11, 1996
- M. A. Poletti, “A comparison of passive and active coupled rooms for acoustic control” Internoise 98, Christchurch 16–18 November
- S. Ellison and M. Poletti, "Variable Room Acoustics System: Philosophy and Applications", Proc. Institute of Acoustics, Volume 22 Pt 6 2000, p 215-223
- S. Ellison and M. A. Poletti, Control of room acoustic parameters by the Variable Room acoustics System, Reproduced Sound 2004
- M. A. Poletti and R. Schwenke, “Prediction and Verification of Powered Loudspeaker Requirements for an Assisted Reverberation System,” 121st AES Convention 2006 October 5–8, San Francisco, CA, USA
