= Operations Enhance and Enhance Plus =

US operations in the Vietnam War in 1972

Operations Enhance and Enhance Plus in the Vietnam War transferred large quantities of United States military equipment and bases to the South Vietnamese government in advance of the Paris Peace Accords which ended American involvement in the war. The two operations were conducted between May and December 1972.

== Operation Enhance ==
In late March 1972, North Vietnam launched the Easter Offensive against South Vietnam. The communist objective was to weaken the South Vietnamese armed forces, capture additional South Vietnamese territory and weaken American resolve to continue to assist South Vietnam. The Easter Offensive was carried out in the context that North Vietnam was negotiating a peace agreement with the United States and wished to strengthen its position in South Vietnam prior to completing the agreement.

The Easter Offensive put the military forces of South Vietnam under intense pressure. After the fall of the provincial capital of Quang Tri and the capability of the South Vietnamese to stave off North Vietnam in doubt, U.S. President Richard Nixon on 17 May directed that a maximum of U.S. equipment and material be given to South Vietnam as quickly as possible. On 19 May, Nixon approved a list of equipment to be provided to South Vietnam by 1 August and Project Enhance began. Nixon also wanted to build up South Vietnamese military equipment so that, if the anticipated peace agreement declared a moratorium on introducing new military equipment, South Vietnam would have adequate supplies.

Operation Enhance provided South Vietnamese armed forces with artillery and anti-tank weapons, 69 helicopters, 55 jet fighters, 100 other aircraft, and 7 patrol boats. The equipment provided to the Army of the Republic of Vietnam (ARVN) included 2 air defense artillery battalions, 3 175mm artillery battalions, two M48A3 tank battalions and 141 BGM-71 TOW anti-tank missile launchers.

== Operation Enhance Plus ==
On 20 October 1972 Nixon ordered additional U.S. military equipment to be delivered to South Vietnam. Nixon anticipated that a peace agreement would be concluded shortly and that the agreement would ban an expansion of military aid to South Vietnam and permit only a one-for-one replacement of military equipment. He wanted the South Vietnamese to have a maximum of equipment on hand before the restrictions in the peace agreement took place. The last shipment of equipment arrived on 12 December and the peace agreement was not concluded until 27 January 1973.

The equipment transfers to South Vietnam consisted of 234 F-5A and Cessna A-37 Dragonfly fighter planes, 32 Lockheed C-130 Hercules transport planes, 277 UH-1H helicopters, 72 tanks, 117 armored personnel carriers, artillery and 1,726 trucks. The cost of the equipment was about $750 million ($5.7 billion in 2015 dollars). Moreover, most of the U.S. supplied equipment of two departing South Korean divisions (approximately 38,000 men) was also given to South Vietnam. In addition, the U.S. transferred title of its military bases in South Vietnam and all the equipment on the bases to South Vietnam.

The Kelly Air Force Base history writes that the San Antonio Air Materiel Area was deeply involved in Enhance Plus. It helped transfer A-37, F-5E Tiger II, and T-38 Talon aircraft, engines, and spares. Nearly every directorate at Kelly contributed to this effort. The San Antonio Air Materiel Area set several records during this period. In addition to the transfer of A-37s, F-5s, and T-38s, over 18.3 million pounds of cargo were sent on 232 missions using C-141, C-5 Galaxy, Boeing 707 and Douglas DC-8 aircraft. Air Force Headquarters congratulated all concerned for their support in this project. They said it was proud of the ability shown by all air logistics centers and other activities to get the job done in spite of the critical time, worldwide scope of the operation, and the many actions which had to be completed.

== Impact ==
As a result of Operations Enhance and Enhance Plus, South Vietnam at the end of 1972 had the fourth largest air force in the world. However, the ability of the South Vietnamese to use all this equipment and to maintain it was much in doubt. An adviser to President Nguyen Van Thieu said that the operations had political value as a sign that the U.S. would not abandon South Vietnam"

The Paris Peace Accords, signed by all parties to the war on 27 January 1973 prohibited replacement of military equipment in South Vietnam except on a one-for-one basis and ended large transfers of military equipment from the United States. The agreement also required the withdrawal of nearly all U.S. military personnel although the US would retain several thousand civilian advisers in South Vietnam.
