= ENHANCE International =

ENHANCE International, LLC
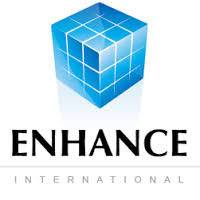
- Company type: Private
- Industry: Insurance/Financial services/Healthcare Management consulting
- Founded: 2009
- Founder: Sam Radwan
- Headquarters: Chicago, United States
- Area served: United States, China, Taiwan
- Website: www.enhance-international.com

ENHANCE International LLC is a management consultancy advising the China Insurance Regulatory Commission and the National Health and Family Planning Commission as China looks to reform health care with the China demographics challenge of an aging population and a shift from the old communist health system to one that has to catch up with China's expanding economy and rapid growth of chronic diseases. ENHANCE International LLC held a conference with White House adviser and Affordable Care Act architect Dr. Ezekiel Emanuel and Minister for Health Reform Mr. Liang Wan Nian under Minister Li Bin (politician). A key outcome of the meeting is interest of the two commissions in building a model similar to the Affordable Care Act, despite all recent controversy this program has received in the United States. ENHANCE International LLC is often quoted and published on China's insurance reform, in most of the major financial news sources including CNBC, Bloomberg Businessweek, The Wall Street Journal, The Economist, Financial Times and A. M. Best's Best Review. ENHANCE International LLC also worked with Sean Chen (politician), the former premier of Taiwan, when he was the chairman of the Financial Supervisory Commission (Republic of China) of Taiwan and negotiating the financial Memorandum of Understanding with China.
