= Seed enhancement =

Pre-sowing treatment to improve seed performance

Seed enhancement is a range of treatments of seeds that improves their performance after harvesting and conditioned, but before they are sown. They include priming, steeping, hardening, pregermination, pelleting, encrusting, film-coating, tagging and others, but excludes treatments for control of seed born pathogens.

They are used to improve seed sowing, germination and seedling growth by altering seed vigor and/or the physiological state of the seed. The alteration may improve vigor or the physiological state of the seed by enhancing uniformity of germination.

Treatments may include hydration treatments, such as priming, steeping, hardening, and pre-germination. Other treatment include the use of chemicals that trigger systemic acquired resistance or improve stress tolerance. The use of antioxidants. Enhancements like pelleting, coating and encrusting improve seed handling and planting. Some treatments enhance nutrient availability or provide inoculates by delivering materials (other than pesticides) needed during sowing, germination and seedling establishment.
