= Kelly Field =

Military facility in San Antonio, Texas

- Part of Joint Base San Antonio
- San Antonio, Texas in the United States
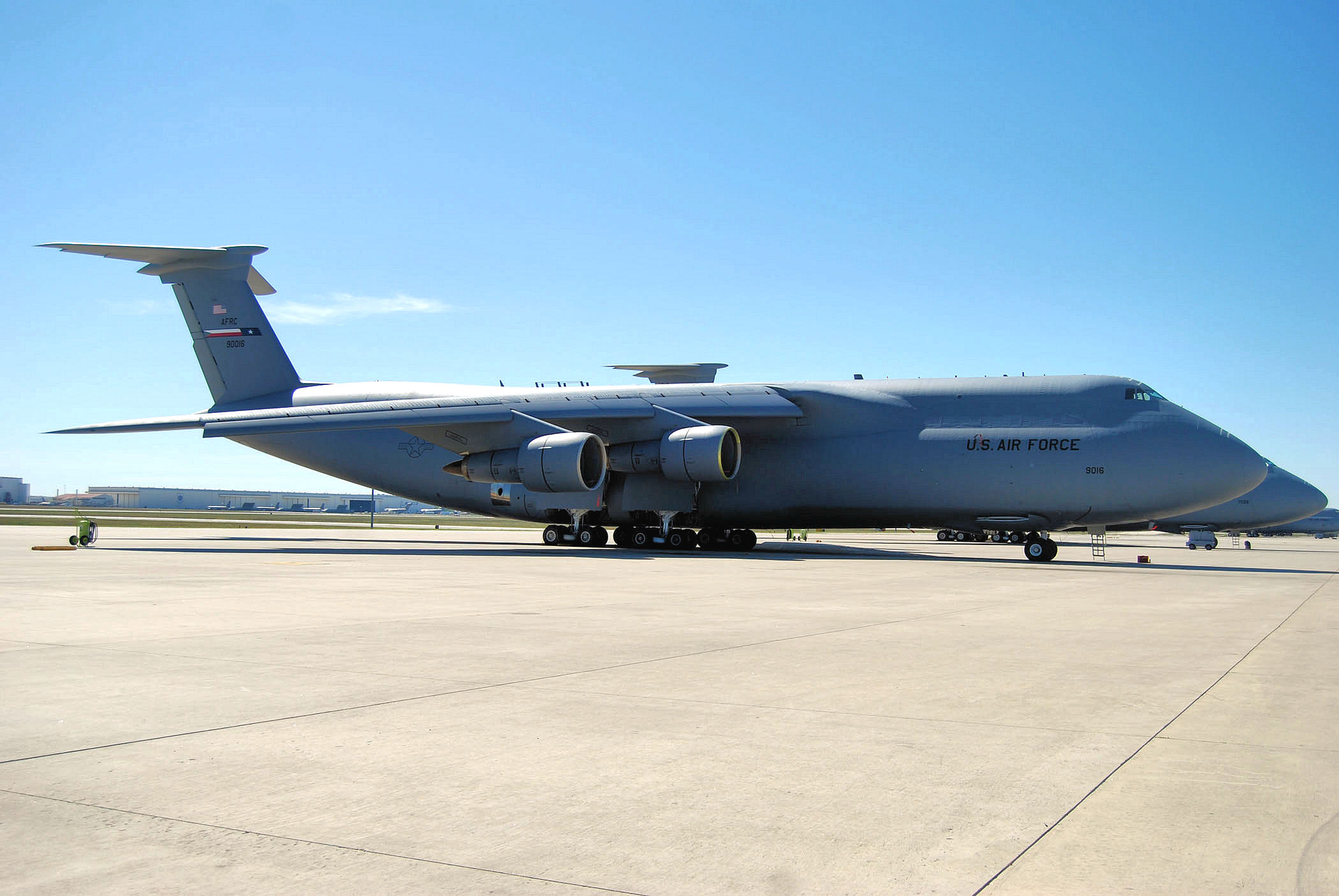
- A US Air Force C-5 Galaxy of the 433rd Airlift Wing at Kelly Field during 2011

Site information
- Type: US Air Force airfield
- Owner: Department of Defense
- Operator: United States Air Force
- Controlled by: Air Education and Training Command
- Condition: Operational
- Website: Official website (Joint Base San Antonio)

Location
- Coordinates: 29°23′00″N 098°34′51″W

Site history
- Built: 1917
- In use: 1917 – 2001 (Kelly Field and AFB); 2001 – 2018 (Kelly Field Annex); 2018 – present (Kelly Field)

Garrison information
- Occupants: 149th Fighter Wing; 433rd Airlift Wing

Airfield information
- Identifiers: IATA: SKF, ICAO: KSKF, FAA LID: SKF, WMO: 0722535
- Elevation: 210.4 metres (690 ft) AMSL
Runways
Direction	Length and surface
16/34	3,520.4 metres (11,550 ft) Porous European Mix

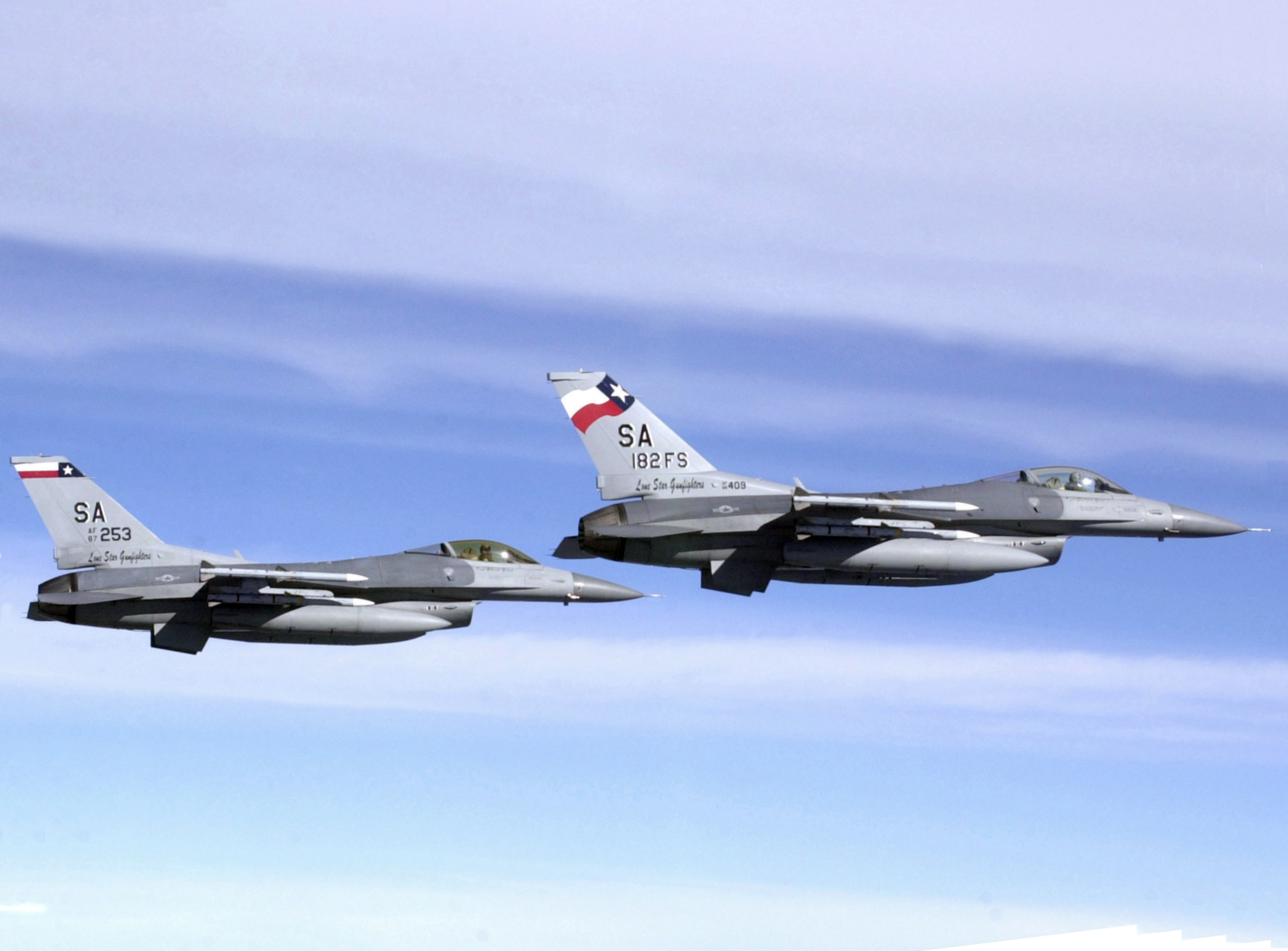
F-16C Block 25F/30F Fighting Falcon fighters (s/n 85-1403, 87-0253) from the 182d Fighter Squadron, 149th Fighter Wing, Texas Air National Guard.

Kelly Field (formerly Kelly Air Force Base) (IATA: SKF, ICAO: KSKF, FAA LID: SKF) is a Joint-Use facility located in San Antonio, Texas. It was originally named after George E. M. Kelly, the first member of the U.S. military killed in the crash of an airplane he was piloting.

In 2001, pursuant to BRAC action, the former Kelly AFB runway and land west of the runway became "Kelly Field" and control of this reduced size installation was transferred to the adjacent Lackland Air Force Base, part of Joint Base San Antonio. The base is under the jurisdiction of the 802d Mission Support Group, Air Education and Training Command (AETC).

Kelly Field was one of thirty-two Air Service training camps established after the United States entry into World War I, being established on 27 March 1917. It was used as a flying field; primary flying school; school for adjutants, supply officers, and engineers; mechanics school, and as an aviation general supply depot.

Kelly Air Force Base and its associated San Antonio Air Logistics Center of the Air Force Materiel Command (formerly Air Force Logistics Command) was closed as an independent installation and its assets realigned by the 1995 Base Realignment and Closure Commission.

== Current status ==
Kelly Field supports flight operations of two tenant commands, the Air Force Reserve Command's 433d Airlift Wing, operating the Lockheed C-5 Galaxy and the Texas Air National Guard's 149th Fighter Wing, operating the General Dynamics F-16 Fighting Falcon.

The remaining 1,873 acres (758 hectares) of land, including hangars and industrial facilities previously known as the San Antonio Air Logistics Center, is operated by the Greater Kelly Development Authority (a political subdivision of the State of Texas, now renamed the Port Authority of San Antonio) as the Port San Antonio business park.

Several large warehouses on the grounds of Port San Antonio were cleared, cleaned, and equipped with large mobile air conditioning units to house evacuees from Hurricane Katrina and Hurricane Rita in September 2005.

== History ==
Kelly Field is named in honor of 2nd Lieutenant George Edward Maurice Kelly. Lt. Kelly, who after a course of training at the Curtiss Aviation School, Rockwell Field, California, was ordered to Fort Sam Houston, near San Antonio. While attempting to land on 10 May 1911 in order to avoid running into a tent and thereby possibly injuring several others, Kelly died in a crash, falling into the ground.

=== Origins ===
In August 1913, U.S. Army Chief Signal Officer Brigadier General George P. Scriven testified before the U.S. House of Representatives concerning the establishment of a military aeronautical center in San Antonio, Texas. The center was to be built for the Aviation Section of the U.S. Army Signal Corps. General Scriven described San Antonio as “the most important strategic position of the South,” in response to the unrest resulting from the Mexican Revolution. In 1916, when Fort Sam Houston was the primary site of the Corps’ aerial equipment and personnel, The San Antonio Light predicted that the city would be “the most important military aviation center in the U.S.”

In November 1915, the newly created 1st Aero Squadron arrived at Fort Sam Houston after a cross-country flight from Fort Sill, Oklahoma. However, the squadron remained at the post only until March 1916, whereupon it left to join Brigadier General John J. Pershing’s Punitive Expedition against Pancho Villa on the U.S.-Mexico border. Problems experienced by the 1st Aero Squadron on that expedition and the ongoing war in Europe persuaded Congress to improve and expand the nation's air arm.

It was quickly apparent that Fort Sam Houston had inadequate space for additional flying operations, especially with newer and more powerful aircraft. Major Benjamin Foulois, with the support of the San Antonio Chamber of Commerce, selected a site five miles southwest of the city for a new aviation airfield on 21 November 1916. Bordered by the Frio City Road on the northwest, the site was also adjacent to the Southern Pacific Railroad, providing easy access by road and rail. In addition, the new site was relatively flat, and thus suitable for flying operations. Initially, the site was called the South San Antonio Aviation Camp.

=== World War I ===
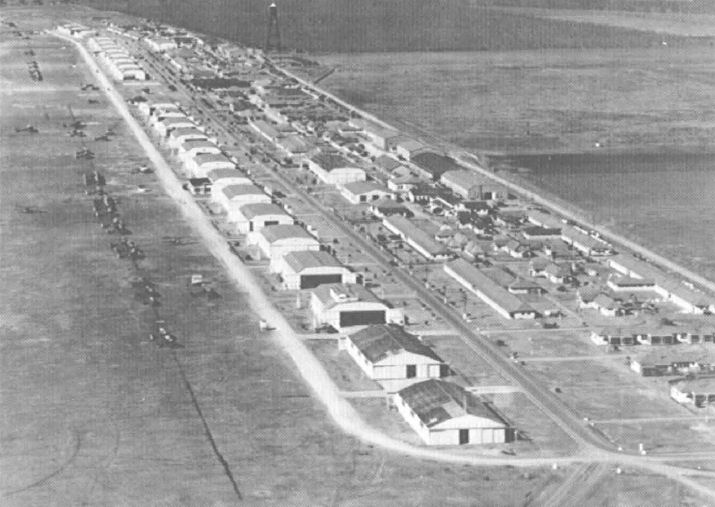
Kelly Field, 1920

On 5 April 1917, four aircraft took off from Fort Sam Houston, flew across San Antonio and landed on the new airfield, which at the time was a cleared cotton field. Tents had been erected as hangars, however, a permanent presence at the airfield was not established until 7 May when 700 men arrived. A week later, the population had grown to 4,000. Construction of the facility was rapid, with the United States now at war and the mission of the new airfield was to train aviators to be sent to the Western Front in France. The ground was cleared and scores of buildings - hangars, barracks, mess halls, a street system, electrical and plumbing systems, warehouses, machine shops were all constructed during the summer.

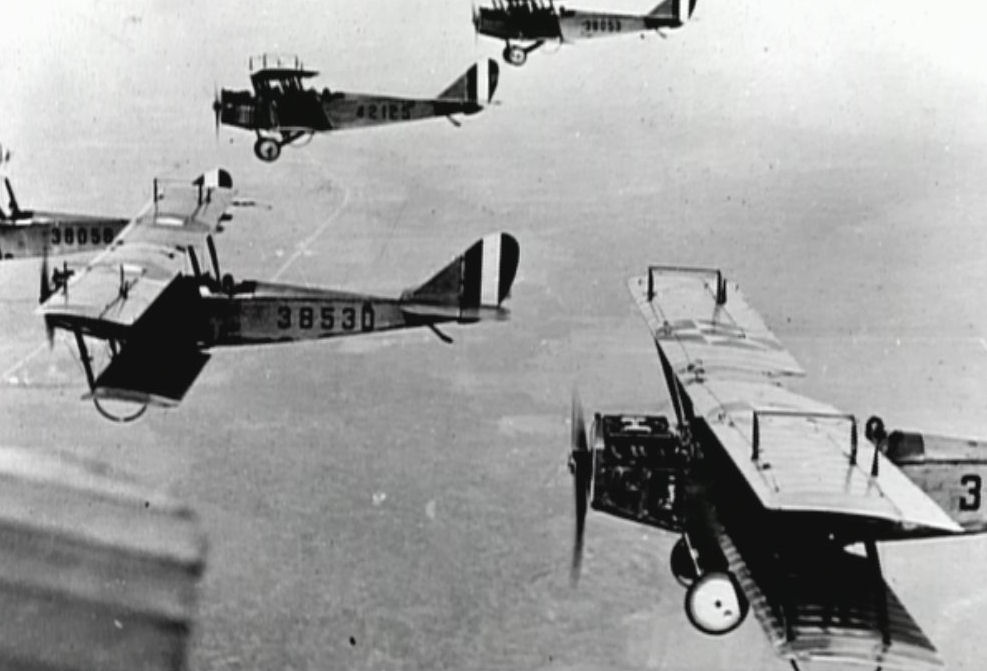
Curtiss JN-4 Jennys training at Kelly Field 1918

By the end of June, it was clear that Foulois' original site, known unofficially as Kelly Field #1, was too small to train both new recruits and aviation cadets. A committee of the San Antonio Chamber of Commerce provided the necessary land and presented the proposition to the Aviation Production Board in Washington, D.C., in June 1917. A contract was signed in July 1917, comprising all of what was Kelly Field #2. Two additional tracts of land, planned to be Kelly Field #3 and #4 were released in the fall of 1917 at the suggestion of British and French aviators who were of the opinion that being so close together, would result in accidents and collisions.

Kelly soldiers organized approximately 250,000 men into "Aero Squadrons" during the hectic months of 1917 and 1918. Eventually, 326 squadrons were formed at Kelly during World War I, with all but twenty of these moving to other installations in the U.S. or overseas. The majority of Aero Squadrons were combat support squadrons. Kelly Field served as the first reception and classification center, testing thousands of recruits before assigning them to specific jobs and squadrons for training. The Air Service Mechanics School Enlisted Mechanics Training Department turned out an average of 2,000 mechanics and chauffeurs a month. Kelly also trained bakers and cooks, and the Aviation General Supply Depot moved to the field from its old location in downtown San Antonio.

Many of the American-trained World War I aviators learned to fly at Kelly field, with 1,459 pilots and 398 flying instructors graduating from the Kelly aviation schools during the course of the war.

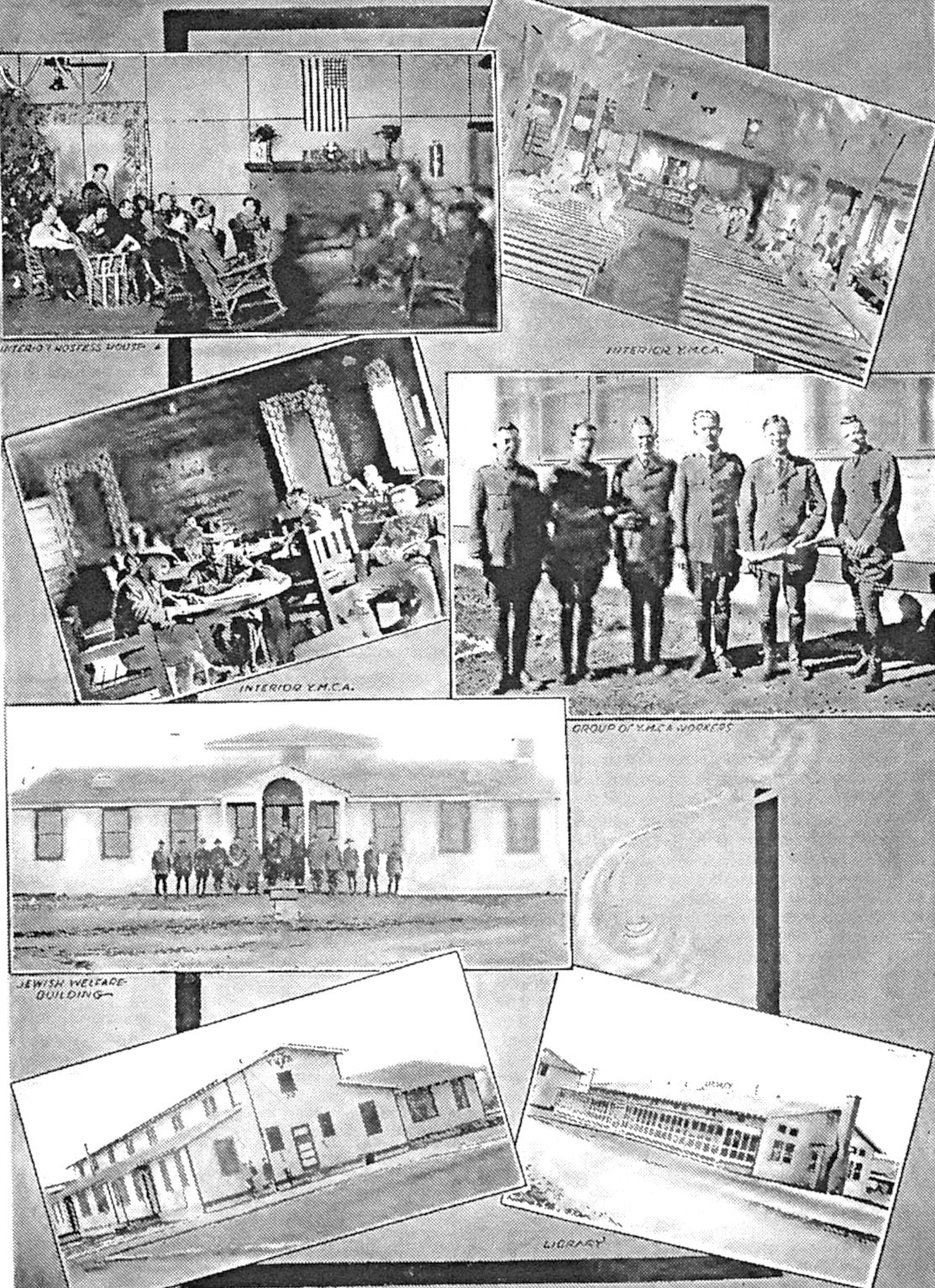
Scenes from Kelly Field during World War I

Flight training units assigned to Kelly Field:

- 103d Aero Squadron, August 1917
- 2d Aero Squadron, November 1917

Re-designated as Squadron "A", July–November 1918

- 115th Aero Squadron (II), March 1918

Re-designated as Squadron "B", July–November 1918

- 117th Aero Squadron (II), March 1918

Re-designated as Squadron "C", July–November 1918

- 178th Aero Squadron, January 1918

Re-designated as Squadron "D", July–November 1918

- 180th Aero Squadron, December 1917

Re-designated as Squadron "E", July–November 1918

- 235th Aero Squadron (II), April 1918

Re-designated as Squadron "F", July–November 1918

- 243d Aero Squadron (II), April 1918

Re-designated as Squadron "G", July–November 1918

- 244th Aero Squadron (II), April 1918

Re-designated as Squadron "H", July–November 1918

- 245th Aero Squadron (II), April 1917

Re-designated as Squadron "I", March 1918

- 110th Aero Squadron (Repair), August 1917

Re-designated: 804th Aero Squadron (Repair), February 1918
Re-designated as Squadron "K", July–November 1918

- Flying School Detachment (Consolidation of Squadrons A-J), November 1918-November 1919

Once deployed to France, most of the Kelly Field graduates were sent to the AEF Third Air Instructional Center, Issoudun Aerodrome, France for advanced pursuit training. In addition to the flying school at Kelly Field, Selfridge Field, Michigan was also used for pilot training, and the British Royal Flying Corps (RFC), operated flying schools for American pilots in Toronto, Ontario and several fields at Camp Taliaferro, Texas.

The thousands of enlistees who came to Kelly devised numerous ways to entertain themselves during their infrequent time off. Among these organizations were a glee club, a minstrel show, and the "Famous Kelly Field Players," a club of professional vaudeville entertainers in uniform. Many clubs traveled around the South Texas area and gained fame for the morale-building shows.

=== Between the wars ===
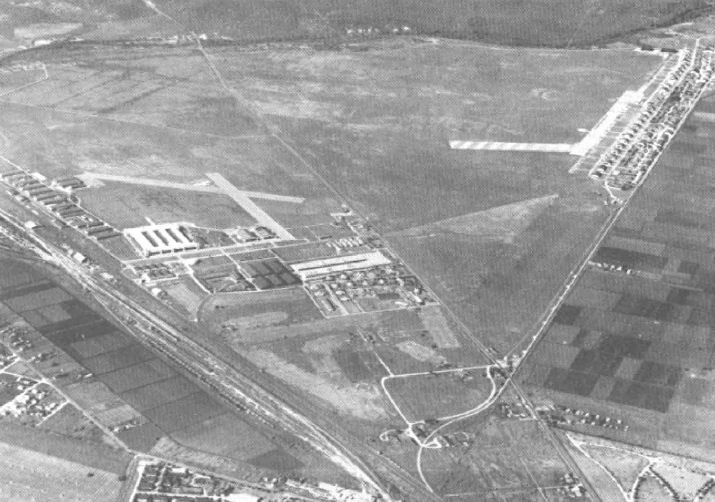
Kelly and Duncan Fields, 1935

At the end of the war, the Army Air Service, along with the rest of the Army, faced crucial reductions. Thousands of officers and enlisted men were released, leaving only 10,000 men to fly and repair the planes and engines left over from the war. Hundreds of small flying fields closed, forcing consolidation of supply and aviation repair depots. Kelly, however, was one of the few that remained open.

On 13 December 1919, the United States House of Representatives passed an appropriations bill for $9.6 million for the purchase of additional land at military camps “which are to be made part of the permanent military establishment.” Kelly Field No. 2 was allocated $349,600 of this amount.

In 1921, the aviation repair depot in Dallas moved to Kelly to join with the supply depot, forming the San Antonio Intermediate Air Depot.

Brooks Field became the center for primary training and Kelly for advanced training. Each phase of instruction lasted about six months initially, with advanced training later divided into three months each of basic and advanced instruction

The 10th School Group (later the Advanced Flying Training Wing and the Advanced Flying School) was formed at Kelly Field #2 in 1922. There, student pilots mastered the advanced skills of pursuit, bombardment, attack, and observation. Most of the Army aviators trained between the two World Wars attended this school. Charles Lindbergh, the first man to fly solo nonstop across the Atlantic, graduated from the Advanced Flying School in 1925. Other graduates included former Air Force Chiefs of Staff Generals Thomas D. White, Curtis E. LeMay, John P. McConnell, Hoyt Vandenberg, and John Dale Ryan. Major General Claire Chennault of World War II "Flying Tiger" fame taught at the school.

In 1925, Kelly Field #1 was renamed Duncan Field in honor of Lieutenant Colonel Thomas Duncan. Formerly stationed at Kelly Field, Duncan died in an airplane accident at Bolling Field in Washington, D.C.. Kelly Field #2 became simply, Kelly Field. Both fields conducted their training, maintenance, command, and supply functions separately for the next 18 years.

Low pay and worn-out planes and equipment did not halt the small band of mechanics and fliers from proving their professional dedication. Army personnel pushed forward the frontiers of aeronautics in the 1920s. The aircraft used for Jimmy Doolittle's 1922 transcontinental flight received preflight servicing at Kelly #1. Kelly #2 was Doolittle's sole refueling stop during the flight itself. In 1926, Kelly was the starting point of the Pan American Goodwill Flight. Their air excursion was a 175-day adventure to "show the flag", with five planes and 10 pilots landing at 23 Central and South American countries. Captain Ira C. Eaker, Commander of the 8th Air Force during World War II and a Kelly graduate, was one of the pilots of that enterprise.

Much of the pioneering work of Major William Ocker and Captain Charles Crane in the field of instrument flying took place at Kelly. Their efforts resulted in the development of the first "blind flying" curriculum at the Advanced Flying School and won Crane the Mackay Trophy.

Public enthusiasm for "those daring young men in their flying machines" encouraged Army pilots to display their skill in an effort to gain public acceptance of the airplane as an ever-capable instrument for American's expanding society. Air circuses and balloon races were exciting events in the Roaring Twenties, and the pilots at Kelly were happy to provide the thrills and air spectacles the public loved. Kelly hosted the National Elimination Balloon Race in 1924 and welcomed thousands of San Antonians to see the lift-off, aerial demonstrations, and other exploits of "derring-do."

But perhaps no event matched the production of the Hollywood film Wings in 1926. Kelly hoped to make motion picture history by providing pilots, aircraft, extras, and technicians to assist in the filming of this World War I epic. Clara Bow (the famous "It Girl"), Buddy Rogers, and Richard Arlen starred in this silent movie classic which was filmed in and around San Antonio. A young newcomer, Gary Cooper, had a bit part in the film. Wings received the first Academy Award for "Best Production of the Year" for 1927–1928, the first (and until 2011, the only) silent film ever to win this honor.

In 1927 basic moved out of the advanced phase and combined with primary. At that point, primary-basic changed to eight months in length and advanced to four months. In June 1927 General Lahm suggested the construction of a single large field outside of the city to house all flying training. Congress funded the new field's construction but not the purchase of the land, so the city of San Antonio borrowed the $546,000 needed to purchase the site selected for what became Randolph Field. By the fall of 1931, construction was essentially completed, so the Air Corps Training Center at Duncan Field, adjacent to Kelly, and the primary schools at Brooks and March moved to the new installation, while advanced training remained at Kelly.

Suffering from a chronic lack of funds, the Air Corps' struggle for better aircraft continued until the 1938 crisis over Czechoslovakia. Adolf Hitler and the Luftwaffe (the German Air Force) demonstrated that air power had become an important factor in international relations. President Franklin D. Roosevelt recognized the significance of the Luftwaffe's role and took the first steps toward United States rearmament.

In 1939, Congress authorized $300 million for the Air Corps. Hundreds of new planes, officers, and enlisted men made their way to Kelly. Besides money for new equipment and more personnel, funds became available for construction of sorely needed barracks, offices, classrooms, and warehouses. Many of the facilities built during this period remain in use today. The present Officer's Club (originally built for cadet housing) and the Air Logistics Center headquarters building (originally used for classrooms) were constructed to meet the increased demand for facilities during this period of expansion.

In the summer of 1942 Duncan Field and Kelly Field merged to form Kelly Field, due to the congested flying conditions caused by the four flying fields in close proximity (Duncan, Kelly, Brooks and Stinson) had reached dangerous levels.

Other facilities built during the construction boom included the unique Miniature Range building, then used for aerial observation training, and the "Palace", a huge complex of enlisted quarters, dining halls and offices. Originally called "Buckingham Palace", the building received its nickname because it was so much more "palatial" than the tents and crude wooden barracks the men had been living in.

=== World War II ===
Kelly Field 1942 USAAF Classbook

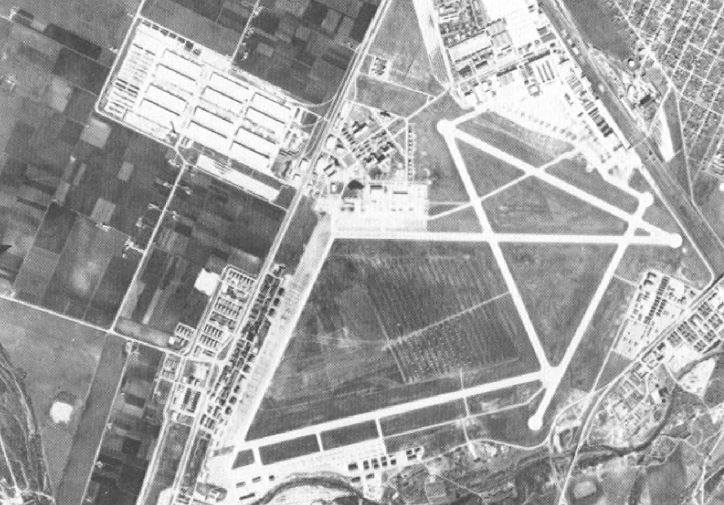
Kelly Field - 1946

After the Japanese Attack on Pearl Harbor on 7 December 1941, the need for more pilots, bombardiers, and navigators resulted in the rapid expansion of the United States Army's air arm and the Advanced Flying School. Night flying was added to the school program and the amount of training time doubled. Between January 1939 and March 1943, over 6,800 men graduated from Kelly's Advanced Flying School and approximately 1,700 additional pilots graduated from various other courses in the Instructor's School. In order to house the rapidly growing pilot trainee population, a "tent city" sprang up as it had in World War I.

By the summer of 1942, congestion caused by the close proximity of four flying fields - Duncan, Kelly, Brooks, and Stinson - had become dangerous. Consequently, in March 1943, Kelly and Duncan were reunited under the name of Kelly Field. Kelly Field's primary functions became that of maintenance and supply. This was a major change in mission for Kelly as flying training moved elsewhere.

Kelly's World War II mission turned the base into a huge industrial complex. A new organization, the San Antonio Air Service Command, managed the increased supply and maintenance workload at would become the San Antonio Air Logistics Center in later years. Kelly workers overhauled, repaired, and modified aircraft, engines, and related equipment.

=== Post-war years ===
When World War II ended in August 1945, America demobilized as rapidly as it had after the First World War. Over 3,000 Kelly civilians resigned or retired within weeks of V-J Day. Nevertheless, more and more AT-6, P-51, and B-29 aircraft were delivered to Kelly for maintenance and storage. Disposal and aircraft storage programs took up more and more of Kelly's time and space. Kelly's maintenance workers stopped repairing very heavy bombers and began supporting the occupational forces in Europe and Japan with air transportation, communications, and weather systems. In 1946, the San Antonio Air Technical Services Command became the San Antonio Air Materiel Area (SAAMA).

In July 1947, President Harry S. Truman signed the National Security Act, which, among other things, created an independent United States Air Force. Over the next few years, the youngest of the armed services separated itself from the Army way of doing things. In January 1948, Kelly Field became Kelly Air Force Base.

=== Berlin airlift and Korean War ===
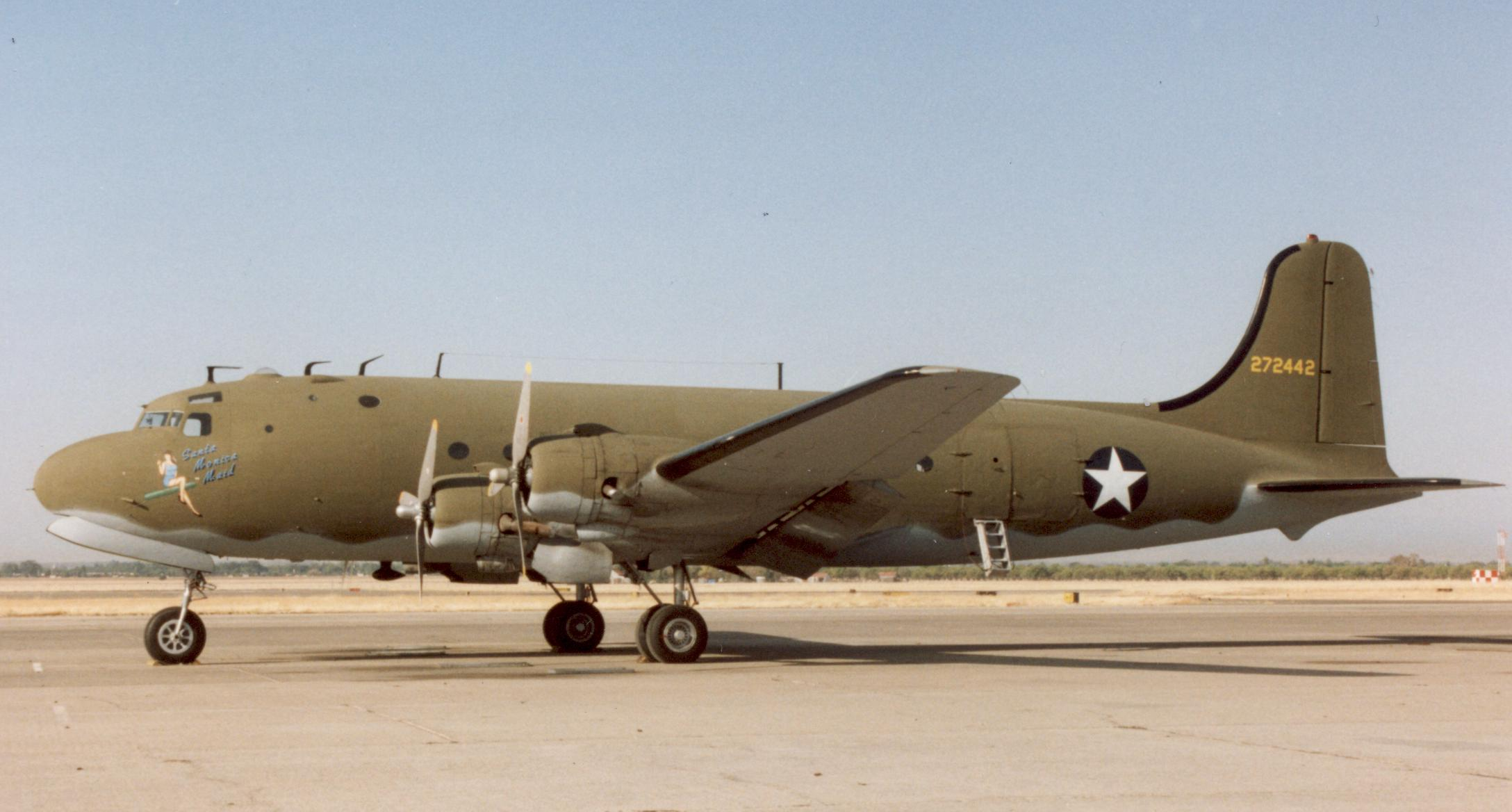
The C-54 Skymaster was propelled by the R2000 engine, which was serviced exclusively at Kelly AFB

By June 1948, the Soviet Union, in a move to push the Allies out of Berlin, closed all water, rail, and highway links to the western part of the city. Forced to choose between abandoning West Berlin or supplying all goods by air, the western powers began around-the-clock airlift of vital supplies and material into the beleaguered city. The airlift, nicknamed "Operation Vittles", became the largest air cargo operation of all time. The prime workhorse of the Berlin Airlift was the C-54 Skymaster cargo aircraft, and Kelly was the only depot in the country repairing and overhauling replacement Pratt and Whitney R2000 engines used on the aircraft. By December 31, the Supply Division had shipped 1,317 R2000 engines worth $1.7 million for the airlift.

The outbreak of the Korean War in June 1950 found Kelly once again responding almost overnight. The Kelly maintenance line went into full-steam production to recondition Boeing B-29 Superfortresses that had been in storage for overseas service. Work continued into the night by use of special outdoor lighting. The aircraft production line earned the nickname of the "Great White Way" as the glow of lights reflected on the aluminum skin of the bombers and lit up the evening sky. When the fighting subsided in Korea in July 1953, Kelly workers had once again proven their commitment to meet whatever challenges faced them.

==== 1950s ====
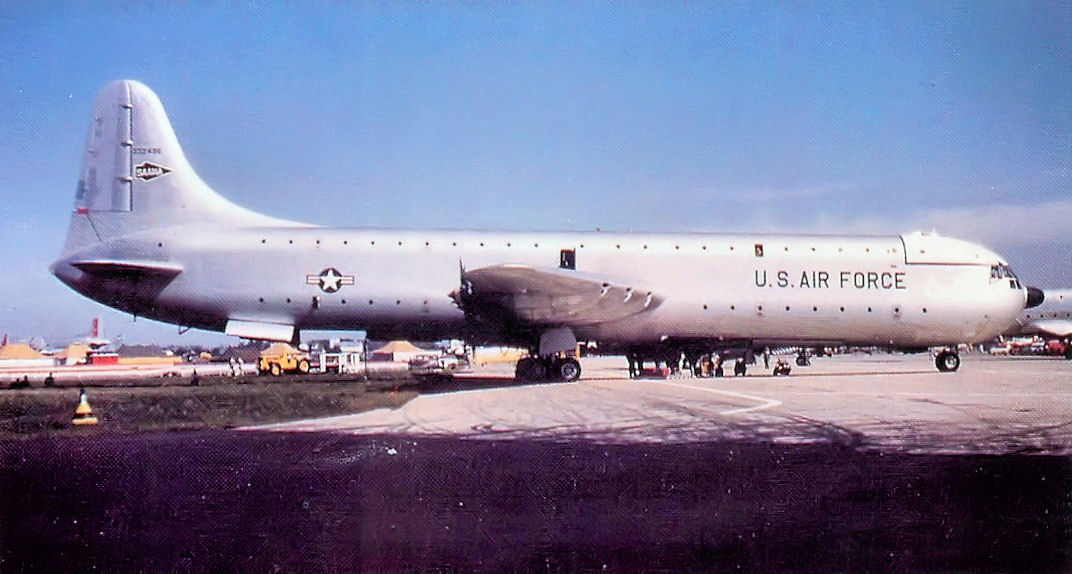
Convair XC-99 attached to the MATS 1700th Air Transport Group, Kelly AFB, Texas, 1954. Note San Antonio Air Materiel Area (SAAMA) tail marking, indicating the aircraft was assigned to the Air Materiel Command.

As the Air Force moved through its first decade of independence, its aircraft, engines, accessories, and support equipment became increasingly sophisticated and complex, requiring use of new technologies and innovative programs to meet the challenges of the future.

By 1951, the Convair B-36 Peacemaker intercontinental bomber began arriving in ever-increasing numbers at Kelly. With its powerful R4360 engines, the B-36 rapidly took the place of the B-29. The B-36 was radical in its design; its six pusher engines gave it a top speed of over 400 miles per hour, and it was the first American bomber capable of reaching any target on the globe.

R4360 engines also powered the Convair XC-99. Convair built this one-and-only transport in 1947 to use the technology of the B-36 more effectively. As the largest cargo plane to-date, the XC-99 set many world records between 1953 and 1955, before the Air Force decided it did not need large transport planes. The longest flight — 12,000 miles to Rhein-Main Air Base in West Germany — began on 13 August 1953. Carrying 61,000 pounds of vital cargo, it flew to West Germany via Kindley Air Force Base, Bermuda and Lajes Field, Azores and returned a week later carrying another 62,000 pounds. Every place the XC-99 landed, newspaper, radio, and television reporters were there to convey to the public the excitement of the spectacular flight.

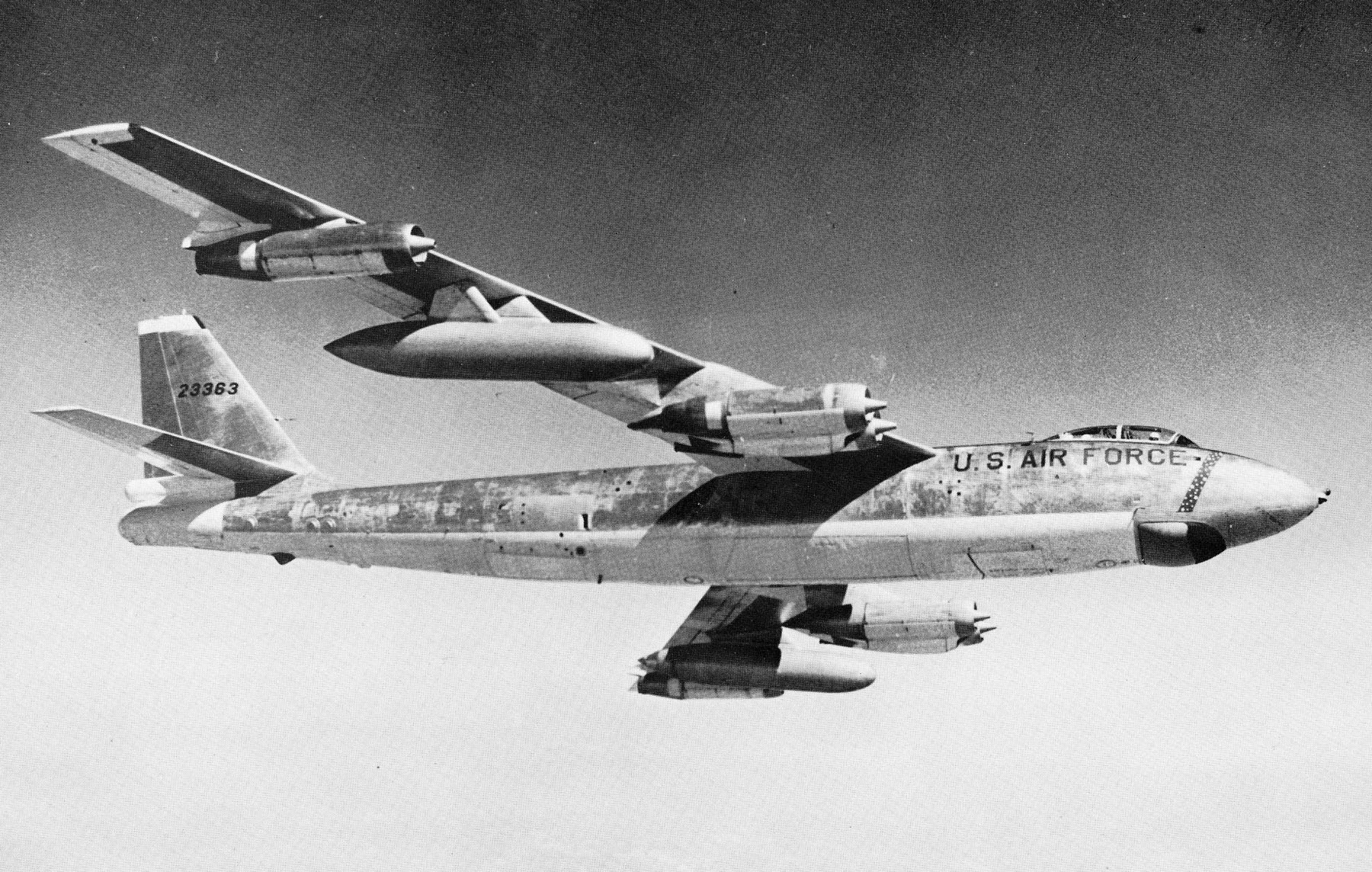
The B-47 was the first all-jet bomber supported by Kelly

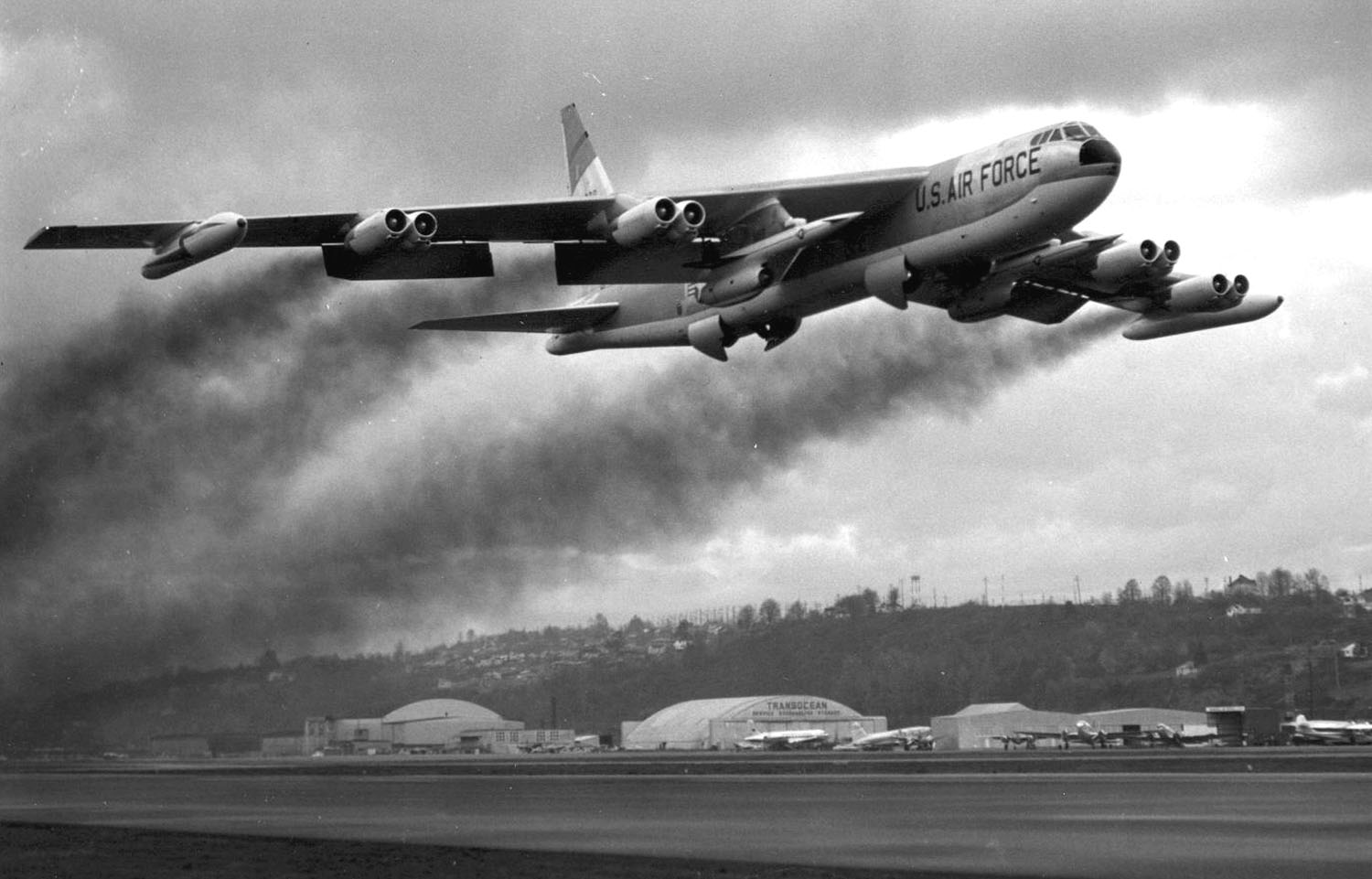
Kelly AFB provided depot-level support for the B-52 from its introduction in 1955 until 1993

Another record-breaking flight took place during May 1955. The XC-99 was put to the test in support of PROJECT DEWLINE. In conjunction with the Military Air Transport Service (MATS), the XC-99 airlifted 380,000 pounds of cargo to Keflavik Airport, Iceland from Dover Air Force Base, Delaware, a distance of 2,500 miles. The plane was airborne 210 hours and 41 minutes. Some trouble was experienced, but the 31 civilian technicians from the San Antonio depot successfully repaired the XC-99 at Dover AFB.

Jet engines had become extremely important to the Air Force by 1955. The Boeing B-47 Stratojet bomber was the first full weapons system bomber. Designed in 1945, the B-47 was powered by six General Electric J47 turbojet engines and featured swept-back wings and tail surfaces. Its mission was to deliver conventional or nuclear ordnance to enemy targets. On 30 November 1959, a B-47 bomber set a world endurance record, remaining airborne for three days, eight hours, and eight minutes, and covering a distance of 32,900 miles. After relegating the bomber to reconnaissance and training missions, the last Stratojets were taken out of the active United States Air Force inventory in 1966.

The Convair B-58 Hustler was yet another important addition to the Air Force inventory. As America's first supersonic bomber, it could range higher and faster than any other bomber aircraft in the world, flying at twice the speed of sound. Its four J79 engines produced over 41,000 pounds of thrust that could push the sleek bomber at more than 1,300 mph. The first B-58 arrived at Kelly on 15 March 1960 to be used for training maintenance personnel for the new overhaul workload. On May 26, 1958, SAAMA opened the B-58 Logistics Support Management Office. It became the forerunner of a major area organizational realignment whereby worldwide weapons management functions would be separated organizationally from the internal depot operations. Responsibilities outlined for the weapon system manager included budgeting, funding, computing requirements, and arranging for maintenance.

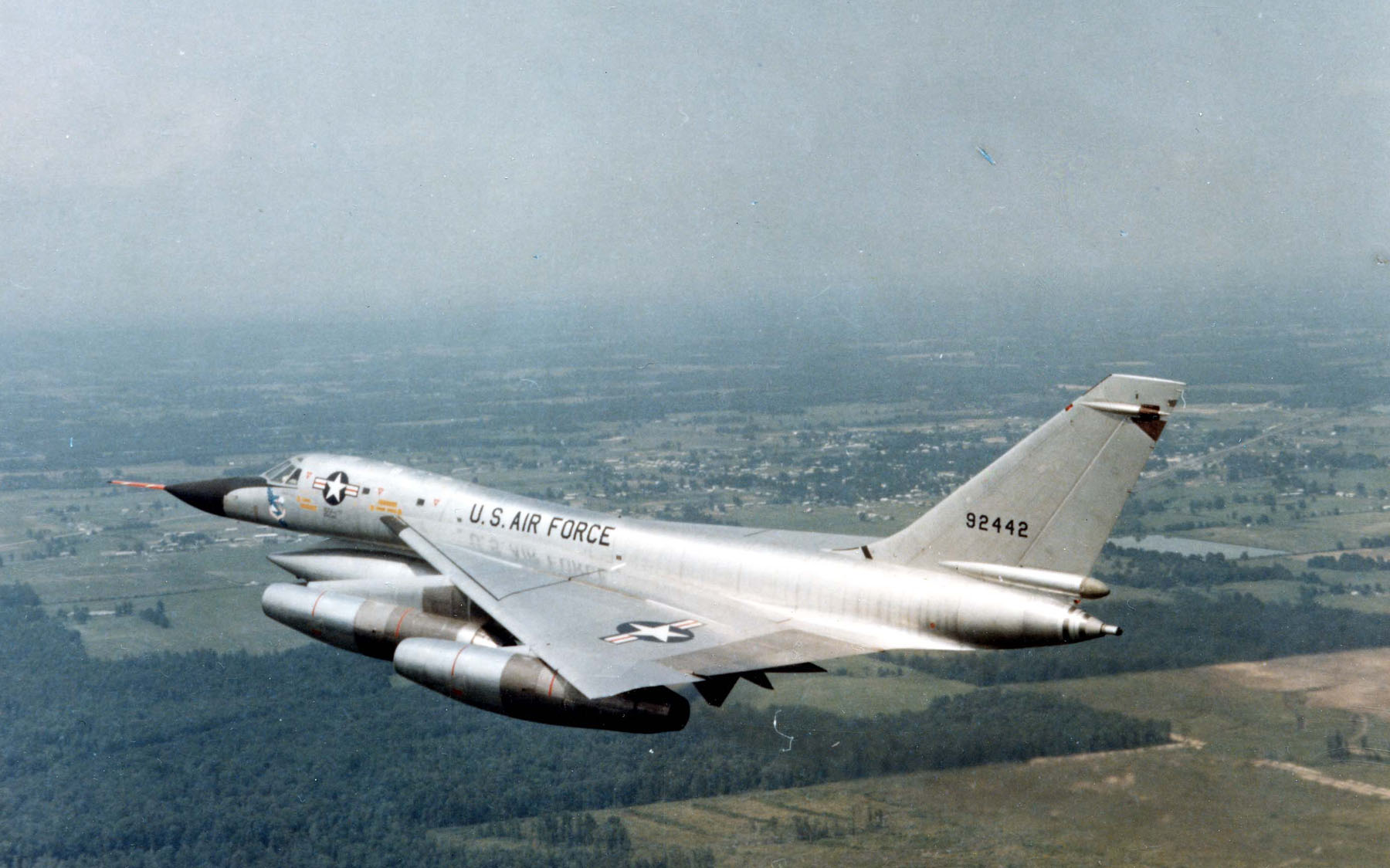
The B-58 was serviced by Kelly workers

Kelly repaired and overhauled B-52s for over 30 years. In the early 1960s, the Boeing B-52 Stratofortress was the major depot-level maintenance workload for SAAMA. Modifications to the B-52s performed at Kelly increased the load capability of each plane and increased the aircraft's range. In addition, the San Antonio shops camouflage-painted the B-52Gs for Southeast Asia Arc Light operations. This era in Kelly's history ended when the Air Force shifted the B-52 workload to Oklahoma City AMA at Tinker Air Force Base in the spring of 1993. The 36-year-old relationship between Kelly and the big bomber was the longest association between any Air Force weapons system and a single ALC to that point.

Americans have always looked to the future, but the future of Kelly's involvement in space have been a "now" responsibility for more than 25 years. In August 1962, SAAMA "loaned" the National Aeronautics and Space Administration (NASA) six aircraft - two F-102s, two TF102s and two T33s - so the astronauts at Houston's Manned Spacecraft Center could maintain their flying proficiency. Two years later, Directorate of Maintenance workers built three Apollo capsule trainers for NASA. And Kelly's Directorate of Aerospace Fuels supplied NASA with the required liquid propellants from the very beginning of the Space Administration's push into space.

==== Vietnam War ====
Kelly's workload remained relatively stable until the mid-1960s, when American efforts to prevent the fall of the South Vietnamese government led to direct American involvement. Following the Gulf of Tonkin incident in August 1964, all air materiel areas began supporting Southeast Asia on a 24-hour basis. For the next 11 years, Kelly employees were deeply involved in supplying parts and expertise for the conflict in Southeast Asia, working both within the United States and overseas.

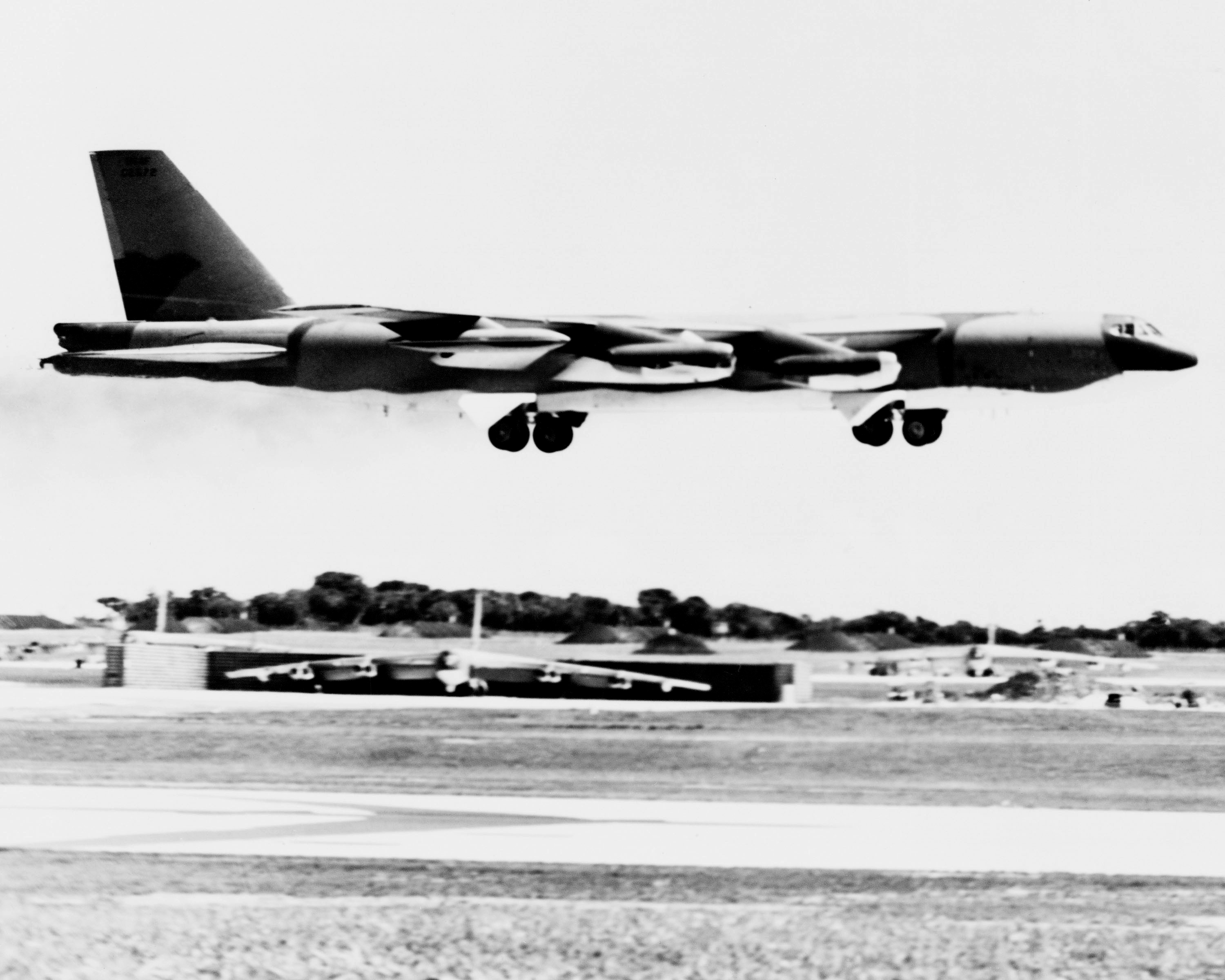
B-52G Stratofortress, modified by Kelly AFB for Arc Light bombing missions in Southeast Asia, landing at Andersen AFB during Linebacker II 1972.

In May 1965, during the build-up of American forces in Vietnam, the Logistics Command started sending teams of supply personnel to the Pacific Air Forces. Kelly had a lot of volunteers. By 31 December 1965, SAAMA had sent 11 supply teams, totaling 89 personnel, on temporary duty to Southeast Asia to establish supply centers throughout the western Pacific, including South Vietnam.

Kelly also sent maintenance teams to Southeast Asia. The first team consisted of six jet engine mechanics that worked at Clark Air Base, Philippines on J57 engines for North American F-100 Super Sabres. Other Kelly workers served in South Vietnam on special Northrop F-5 Freedom Fighter modification teams, helped reassemble newly shipped F-5A/C aircraft at Bien Hoa Air Base, and assisted in the creation of an engine repair facility at Bien Hoa. Some workers served on rapid area maintenance supply support or area transportation teams while others served as weapon system logistic officers. Those who remained in San Antonio also strove to meet the demands for materiel and aircraft maintenance.

On 1 July 1965, Kelly opened as an aerial port of embarkation to provide though-plane cargo service to Southeast Asia. Kelly Air Force Base personnel processed and routed vital war material earmarked for South Vietnam to the Southeast Asian Theater. By 1967, the pace of the United States build-up intensified. The Lockheed C-141A Starlifter cargo aircraft began to enter the Air Force inventory in sufficient numbers to replace the aging Douglas C-124 Globemaster II. With air terminal modernization and the increased use of C-141 aircraft, Military Airlift Command (MAC) aircrews seldom experienced any delays at Kelly's aerial port.

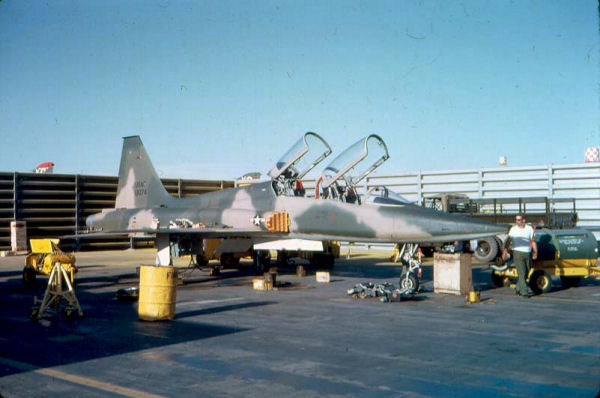
Northrop F-5B Freedom Fighter (s/n 65-13074) of the 602th Fighter Squadron at Bien Hoa Air Base, South Vietnam, in 1966. It was part of the project "Skoshi Tiger" to evaluate the F-5.

On 1 November 1965, SAAMA assumed responsibility for the Air Force's entire watercraft program. This included all landing-type vessels, spares, engines, and combat ships. Other items included cargo tanks, special service vessels, barges, small craft, dredges, rigging, and marine hardware. Earlier that year, on 3 August, Kelly became responsible for assembly and shipment of the necessary airfield lighting equipment to establish four semi-fixed installations in Southeast Asia.

The early 1970s witnessed the establishment of the Vietnamization Program, also known as the Nixon Doctrine. This new policy was the key to planned reductions in the United States military forces in South Vietnam. As part of this effort, SAAMA personnel were deeply involved in the planning and construction of an engine facility at Bien Hoa Air Base. This assignment began in February 1971 when the Air Force Logistics Command gave the SAAMA the responsibility for developing complete plans and specifications for converting an existing building at Bien Hoa Air Base into an engine overhaul facility.

One month later, the San Antonio Air Materiel Area\ became involved with yet another project to provide logistics support. On 20 October 1972, SAAMA initiated PROJECT ENHANCE PLUS, to transfer A-37, Northrop F-5E Tiger II, and Northrop T-38 Talon aircraft, engines, and support spares to the Republic of Vietnam to carry on the war after American withdrawal. Nearly every directorate at Kelly contributed to this effort.

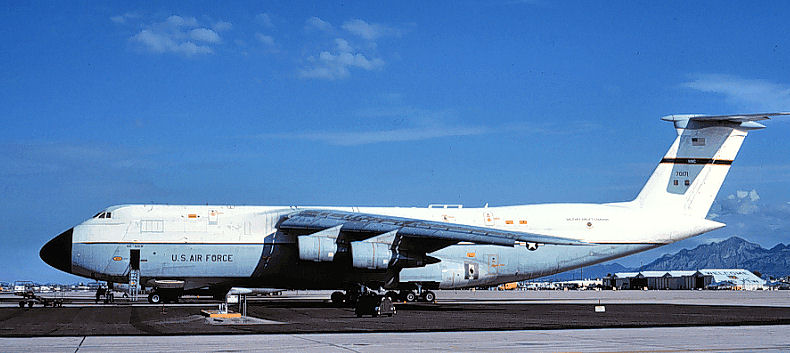
C-5A Galaxy in the 1970s

The C-5A Galaxy, the Air Force's largest aircraft, entered the inventory in June 1970. San Antonio Air Materiel Area had both management and repair responsibility for the giant transport and its TF39 engine. Weighing about 350 tons, the aircraft can transport 98 percent of equipment issued to an Army division, including the 100,000 pound M-1 tank, self-propelled artillery equipment, missiles, and helicopters. On its initial visit to Kelly on 31 January 1970, prominent figures as well as public spectators greeted the C-5A.

A year before the United States ended its involvement in Southeast Asian hostilities; the military services began to prepare for the return of North Vietnam-held Prisoners of War. With the signing of the Paris Peace Accords on 27 January 1973, "Operation Homecoming" was on. The prisoners were flown from North Vietnam to the Joint Homecoming Reception Center at Clark Air Base, Philippines. Once at Clark, the former POWs were given medical checkups, issued uniforms and personal items, and made those very important phone calls home. After a minimum time at Clark, the POWs flew to the United States to be reunited with their families and to receive complete medical and psychological evaluation and treatment. Lackland Air Force Base and Fort Sam Houston were designated as reception areas in San Antonio because each had hospital facilities to handle the needs of the returning prisoners of war. Kelly became the reception area. Flights bringing the former POWs to Kelly began on 15 February 1973. Although crowds were deliberately kept small, the occasion was full of joy. The 11 flights that arrived at Kelly carried 20 Air Force and 12 Army men. Kelly Air Force Base took great pride in welcoming home the brave men who had spent years in captivity.

==== Post-Vietnam era ====
In 1974, San Antonio Air Materiel Area changed its name to the San Antonio Air Logistics Center, but the dedication and support to the Air Force mission remained the same.

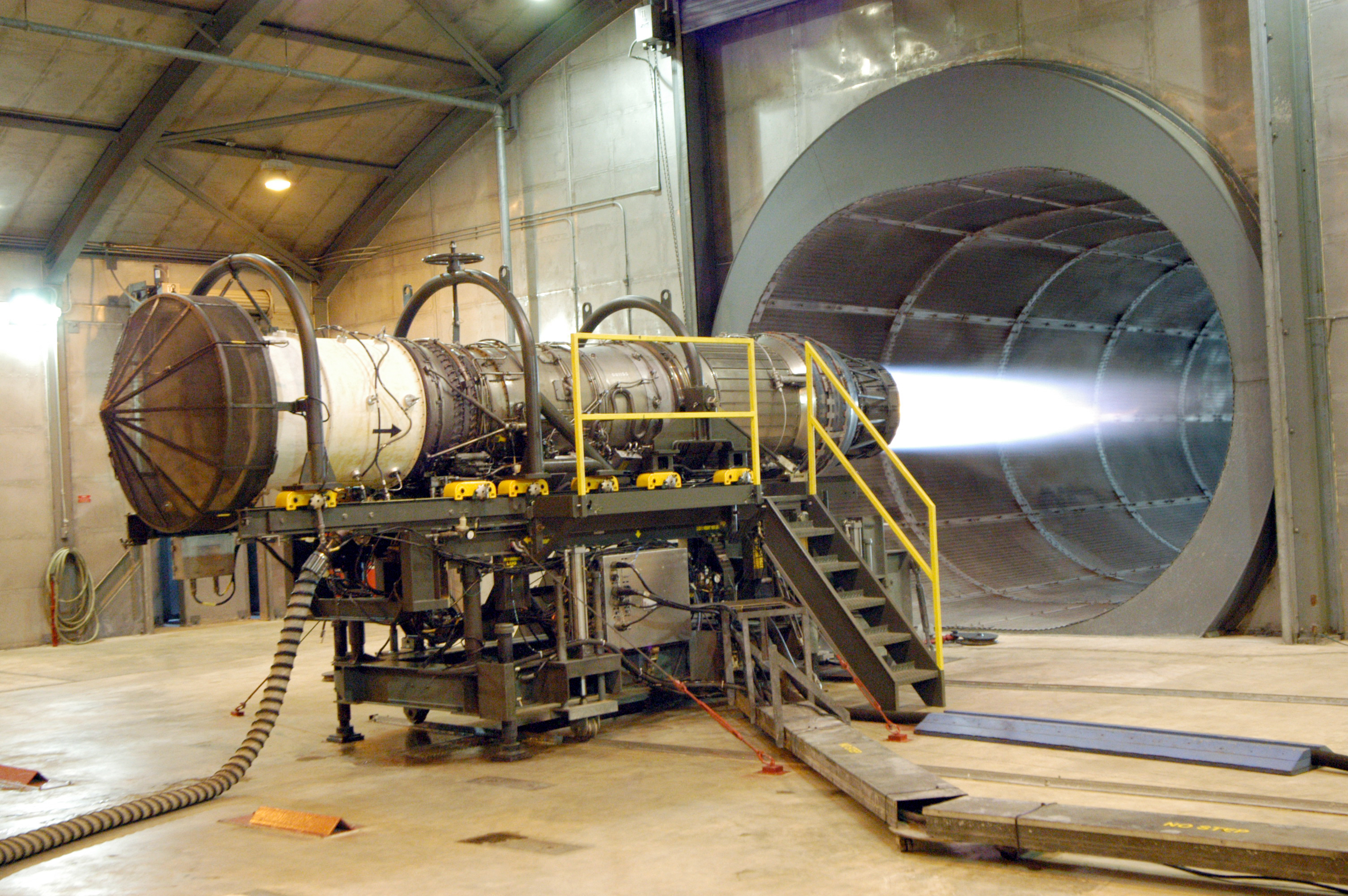
Pratt & Whitney F100 turbofan engine

The first F100 engine arrived at the SA-ALC on 9 August 1974. Primarily used as a trainer, this first engine was also used as a prototype repair engine to determine the adequacy of planning documents, technical data, tools and equipment. Management and maintenance of the F100 is complicated by the unique design of the engine. The engine is divided into five modules. Defective modules could be removed and replaced with spares to return the engine to service more rapidly. Another unique aspect of the F100 engine is the "on-condition" maintenance feature. This occurs if an inspection team determines that the rest of the modules are in good working order. Only the affected part would be overhauled and the rest of the engine would be left alone. In addition, time between overhauls is measured in terms of cycles, or throttling up and down action, rather than flight hours.

As good as the C-5A was, Lockheed and the Air Force began plans to incorporate reliability and maintainability factors into the large cargo plane, producing the C-5B during the early 1980s. The Galaxy "B" fleet added 7.5 million cargo tons per day to the United States military strategic airlift capability.

On 16 November 1973, the Directorate of Aerospace Fuels provided propellants support to the last of the Skylab space program launches. In March 1979, the Space Shuttle "Columbia" perched atop a Boeing 747 arrived at Kelly Air Force Base for the first time for a refueling stop on its way to Kennedy Space Center in Florida. This was Kelly's most dramatic and visible participation in support of the space program but not its last. NASA flights continued to land with parts and equipment for multiple Space Shuttle missions en route to Kennedy Space Center as late as June 2009.

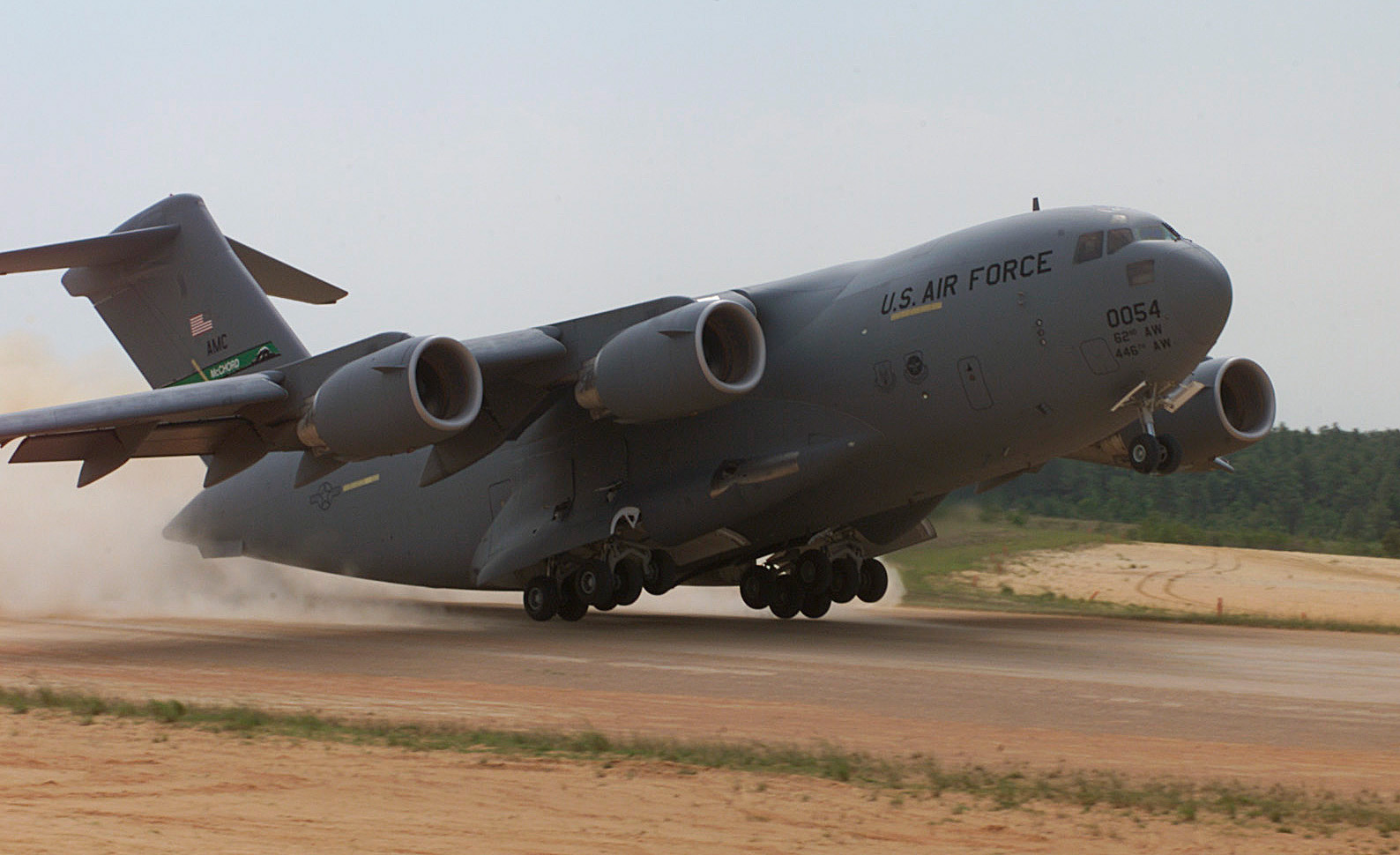
C-17 Globemaster III

The San Antonio Air Logistics Center also managed the new Boeing C-17 Globemaster III, developed by McDonnell Douglas in the late 1980s. This advanced aircraft is a rugged, reliable, modern airlifter designed to meet requirements established jointly by the Army, Marines, and the Air Force. The C-17 provides the United States combat commanders with the increased mobility to get to the battle sooner and to win. Kelly's involvement in the C-17 program was further strengthened when Air Force Logistics Command named it the source of repair for the airframe. Logistics support responsibility for the aircraft was made virtually complete in March 1985 when AFLC gave SA-ALC management and repair responsibility for the C-17 engines, the Pratt & Whitney F117-PW-100 turbofans.

With the transfer of B-52 repair and overhaul to Oklahoma City in 1993, Kelly's workers shifted their attention to keeping the T-38 jet trainers of Air Education and Training Command ready to fly. This workload moved to Kelly in the spring of 1993.

=== Closure ===
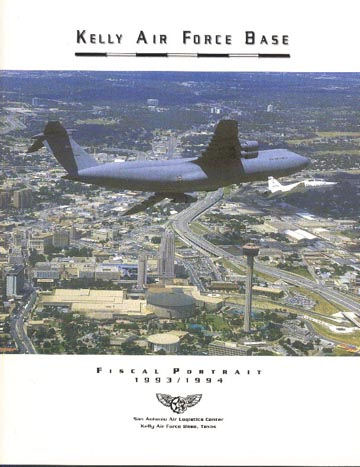
Kelly AFB document, 1993

During Operation Just Cause, Kelly served as a transit point for more than 8,200 troops deploying to Panama and as a reception site for some 250 incoming wounded service members. Later, the base moved more than 10,000 short tons of material and 4,700 passengers and deployed 17 million pounds of munitions to Southwest Asia for Operation Desert Storm. During the 1990s, it supported US operations in Kosovo.

In 1992, a major defense reorganization had shifted ownership of most of Kelly's warehouse space from the Air Force to the new Defense Logistics Agency. The following year, the Base Realignment and Closure Commission added Kelly and three other logistics centers to the list of installations marked for closure. Local officials convinced the commissioners to spare the base, but it was only a temporary stay.

Kelly Air Force Base was closed because the Base Realignment and Closure Commission round of 1995 decided the base's workload should be consolidated with that of other Air Force depots. Kelly was troublesome from a labor relations standpoint, and was seen as something of a "closed system" where active air force personnel became contractors and eventually union, government employees supervising their friends. At the same time McClellan Air Force Base in Sacramento, California, was also closed. Instead of shifting all workloads, some were outsourced or privatized by the Clinton administration. Parts of the installation were shifted to Lackland Air Force Base, with a significant portion becoming Port San Antonio. Prior to the shutdown it was still a vital part of San Antonio, including but not limited to providing host to Air Force One's backup airplane in 1998. After closure labor disputes dropped by 50% across USAF maintenance centers.

The 37th Training Wing at Lackland AFB, Texas, assumed responsibility for the Kelly AFB flightline area and the area west of the runway on 1 April 2001, the area being designated Kelly Field Annex.

Port San Antonio (formerly known as KellyUSA) has now renamed the logistics center Port San Antonio in line with its business strategy of becoming the largest inland port in South Texas.

=== Facility names ===
- Aviation Camp (a.k.a. Remount Station) at Fort Sam Houston, c. February 1917
- Camp Kelly, 11 June 1917
- Kelly Field, 30 July 1917
- Kelly Air Force Base, 29 January 1948 – 30 September 2001.

Flightline and airfield area designated: Kelly Field Annex (becoming part of Lackland AFB)
Station area transferred to civilian control.

=== Major commands to which assigned ===
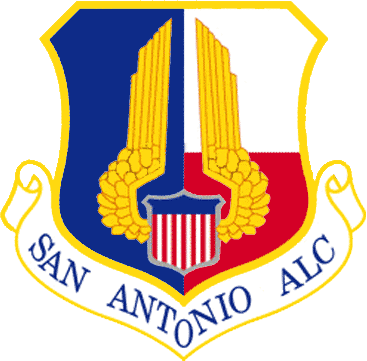
San Antonio Air Logistics Center - Emblem

- Aviation Section, Signal Corps, May 1917
- Division of Military Aeronautics, 27 April 1918
- Air Service, United States Army, 27 August 1918
- United States Army Air Service, 1 July 1920
- United States Army Air Corps, 2 July 1926
- Air Corps Training Center, 1 September 1926

Re-designated: Gulf Coast Air Corps Training Center, 8 July 1940

- Gulf Coast Army Air Forces Training Center, 1 May 1942
- Air Service Command, 11 March 1943
- Army Air Forces Materiel and Services Command, 17 Jul 1944

Re-designated: Army Air Forces Technical Service Command 31 Aug 1944

- Air Technical Service Command, 1 July 1945
- Air Materiel Command, 9 March 1946
- Air Force Logistics Command, 1 April 1961
- Air Force Materiel Command, 1 June 1992 – 30 September 2001

=== Detached installations ===
- Kelly Field #1

South of Kelly Air Force Base, acquired 1917. Together with Kelly Field #2, designated Duncan Field on 13 March 1925. Combined with Kelly Field, 2 March 1943.

- Kelly Field #2 (a.k.a. Pampa Air Force Auxiliary Field #2)

South of Kelly Air Force Base, acquired 1917. Combined with Kelly Field #1 and designated Duncan Field, 13 March 1925.

- Kelly Field #3

2 miles East of Castroville, Texas. Acquired early 1939, transferred to Hondo Army Air Field, Texas, 12 February 1943.

- Kelly Field #4

9 miles Northwest of Kelly AFB. Acquired 1 June 1939, transferred to Brooks Field, 12 February 1943.

- Kelly Field #5

6 Miles South-Southeast of San Antonio, Texas. Was Gosport Field, civilian airport, acquired early 1917, Re-designated: Brooks Field, 4 February 1918.

=== Major units assigned ===
==== American Expeditionary Force combat squadrons ====
- 9th Aero Squadron, 14 June-8 July 1917
- 12th Aero Squadron, 2 June-18 July 1917
- 13th Aero Squadron, 14 June-8 July 1917
- 17th Aero Squadron, July-17 August 1917
- 17th Aero Squadron (Provisional)

Re-designated: 22d Aero Squadron, 16 June-3 August 1917

- 21st Aero Squadron (Provisional)

Re-designated: 27th Aero Squadron, 15 June-17 August 1917

- 24th Aero Squadron, June-28 December 1917
- 28th Aero Squadron, 22 June-25 August 1917
- 41st Aero Squadron, 16 June-28 August 1917
- 49th Aero Squadron, 6 August-28 December 1917
- 50th Aero Squadron, 6 August-28 December 1917
- 88th Aero Squadron, 18 August-7 October 1917
- 91st Aero Squadron, 21 August-5 October 1917
- 99th Aero Squadron, 21 August-2 November 1917
- 100th Aero Squadron, August-17 October 1917
- 103d Aero Squadron, 31 August-5 November 1917
- 104th Aero Squadron, 25 August-4 November 1917
- 138th Aero Squadron, September–October 1917
- 139th Aero Squadron, September–October 1917
- 147th Aero Squadron, November 1917
- 148th Aero Squadron, 11–17 November 1917
- 354th Aero Squadron, January–March 1918

==== Post World War I organizations ====
- Post Headquarters, Kelly Field, September 1917-March 1920
- Air Service Mechanics School, March 1920-January 1921
- 1st Pursuit Group, 31 August 1919 – 30 June 1921
- 1st Bombardment Wing, August 1919-26 June 1924
- 1st Day Bombardment Group, 25 September 1919 – 26 June 1922
- 8th Aero Squadron, 21 June-5 July 1917; 25 May-13 August 1919

Re-designated: 8th Attack Squadron, 2 June 1921-28 July 1926

- 11th Aero (later 11th) Squadron, 26 June-12 August 1917; 8 November 1919 – 30 June 1922
- 20th Aero (later 20th) Squadron, 26 June-29 July 1917; 24 September 1919 – 30 June 1922
- 26th Attack Squadron, 15 September 1921 – 27 June 1924
- 27th Aero (later 27th) Squadron, 31 August 1919 – 30 June 1922
- 90th Aero Squadron, 20 August-5 October 1917; c May-29 November 1919

Re-designated: 90th Attack Squadron, 2 July 1921-1 July 1926

- 94th Aero (later 94th) Squadron, 20 August-5 October 1917; 31 August 1919-1 June 1921
- 95th Aero (later 95th) Squadron, 20 August-4 October 1917; 31 August 1919-1 June 1921
- 96th Aero (later Bombardment) Squadron, 20 August-7 October 1917; 12 January 1920 – 30 June 1922
- 147th Aero Squadron (Pursuit), 10–12 November 1917; 31 August 1919

Re-designated: 17th Squadron, 14 March-30 June 1921

- 166th Aero Squadron

Re-designated: 49th Squadron, 18–24 December 1917; 26 September 1919-30 June 1922

- 96th Bombardment Group, 12 January 1920 – 26 June 1922

==== After being established as a permanent military post, 30 September 1922 ====
- 10th School Group, 22 June 1922 – 1 July 1931
- 24th School Wing, 1 August 1927 – 1 October 1931
- 39th School (later Observation) Squadron, 1 August 1927 – 1 September 1936
- Air Corps Advanced Flying School, 1 July 1931 – 22 August 1941
- Air Corps Replacement Training Center, 22 August-1 November 1941
- Air Corps Reception Station, 1 November 1941

Air Corps Classification Center, 1 April 1942
Merged to form: San Antonio Aviation Cadet Center (later Lackland AFB), 4 July 1942

==== United States Air Force organizations ====
- 518th Air Transport Group

Re-designated: 1700th Air Transport Group, 6 June 1948-18 December 1957

- Continental Division, Military Air Transport Service, 1 July 1948 – 25 June 1958
- 62d Troop Carrier Group, 9 May-27 July 1950
- 1708th Ferrying Wing, 16 July 1951 – 1 March 1958
- United States Air Force Security Service, 1 August 1953-
- Air Force Electronic Warfare Center, 8 August 1953-
- USAF Cryptographical Depot, 1 January 1964 – 1 February 1980
- USAF Communications Security Center, 1 July 1972 – 1 February 1980
- USAF Cryptographical Support Center, 1 February 1980-
- 433d Tactical Airlift Wing, 1 November 1960

Re-designated: 433d Airlift Wing on 1 February 1992-Present

- 921st Troop Carrier Group, 17 January 1963

Re-designated as: 921st Tactical Airlift Group, 29 June 1971-1 November 1974

- 922d Troop Carrier Group, 17 January 1963

Re-designated: 922d Tactical Airlift Group, 29 June 1971-30 June 1974

- USAF Commissary Service, 1 January 1976 – 30 September 2001
- 149th Fighter-Interceptor Group, 1 August 1961 (Texas ANG)

Re-designated: 149th Fighter Wing, 1 October 1995-Present

== Airlines and destinations ==
=== Cargo ===
Airlines	Destinations
Amazon Air	Rockford

== See also ==
- List of American Aero Squadrons
- Texas World War II Army Airfields
- Lackland Air Force Base
- United States Army World War I Flight Training
