= Acoustic enhancement =

Sound reinforcement that is unnoticeable

Acoustic enhancement is a subtle type of sound reinforcement system used to augment direct, reflected, or reverberant sound. While sound reinforcement systems are usually used to increase the sound level of the sound source (like a person speaking into a microphone, or musical instruments in a pop ensemble), acoustic enhancement systems are typically used to increase the acoustic energy in the venue in a manner that is not noticed by the audience. The correctly installed systems replicate the desired acoustics of early reflections and reverberation from a room that is properly designed for acoustic music. An additional benefit of these systems is that the room acoustics can be changed or adjusted to be matched to the type of performance. The use of acoustic enhancement as electronic architecture offers a good solution for multi-use performance halls that need to be "dead" for amplified music, and are used occasionally for acoustic performances. These systems are often associated with acoustic sound sources like a chamber orchestra, symphony orchestra, or opera, but have also found acceptance in a variety of applications and venues that include rehearsal rooms, recording facilities conference rooms, sound stages, sports arenas, and outdoor venues.

== Design and application ==
Acoustic enhancement systems use microphones, amplifiers, and loudspeakers interconnected with some form of processing. The number, type, and placement of microphones and loudspeakers varies according to both the application, as well as the physics limitations that are imposed by the inherent operating principles associated with each manufacturer's equipment. In most instances, however, these systems employ at least one array of loudspeakers that are distributed throughout the venue.

As concertgoers have become aware of the use of these systems, debates have arisen, because "...purists maintain that the natural acoustic sound of [Classical] voices [or] instruments in a given hall should not be altered". When employed properly, however, acoustic enhancement can improve listening quality in ways that would be impossible for architectural treatments to accomplish, and deliver sound quality that the concertgoer desires to experience.

At the Vienna Festival in May, 1995, a LARES system was used outdoors to augment the Vienna Philharmonic's performance of Beethoven's Symphony No. 9 conducted by Zubin Mehta. The installers noted that "this was the first time on this location with classical music that we were not criticised for spoiling the music by amplifying it." Commenting on a performance by the Grant Park Symphony Orchestra at the Jay Pritzker Pavilion at Millennium Park Chicago, senior vice president of WFMT radio, Steve Robinson, stated "I have never in my life heard sound projected so faithfully and beautifully over such a great distance; it was an ethereal experience".

Kai Harada's article "Opera's Dirty Little Secret" states that opera houses have begun using electronic acoustic enhancement systems "...to compensate for flaws in a venue's acoustical architecture". Despite the uproar that has arisen amongst operagoers, Harada points out that none of the major opera houses using acoustic enhancement systems "...use traditional, Broadway-style sound reinforcement, in which most if not all singers are equipped with radio microphones mixed to a series of unsightly loudspeakers scattered throughout the theatre".

Instead, most opera houses use the sound reinforcement system for subtle boosting of offstage voices, onstage dialogue, and sound effects (e.g., church bells in Tosca or thunder in Wagnerian operas). Acoustic enhancement systems are most often employed in traditional opera houses to improve the sound of the orchestra and have little if any effect on the sound of the voices. In a review of the State Opera of South Australia's performance of Wagners' Ring Cycle at the Adelaide Festival Centre Theatre, Michael Kennedy of The Sunday Telegraph, London, wrote: “The balance between the orchestra and the voices has been ideal.” The live recording of Wagner: Die Walküre, the world's first 6-channel SACD "blitzed the 2005 Helpmann Awards, winning ten of its eleven nominations and earning critical accolades", and the recording of Wagner: Götterdämmerung was nominated for a 2008 Grammy Award.

== Types ==
There exist different types of acoustic enhancement systems: In-line and feedback systems with or without electronic reverberators.

In-line systems are also called non-regenerative (i.e. no feedback). Feedback systems are also called regenerative. Electronic reverberators can be added in addition using various methods such as convolution and FIR filtering.

In-line systems with electronic reverberators: In-line acoustic enhancement systems include E-coustic LARES (Lexicon Acoustic Reinforcement and Enhancement System), SIAP, the System for Improved Acoustic Performance and ACS, Acoustic Control Systems. These systems use microphones, digital signal processing "with delay, phase, and frequency-response changes", and then send the signal "... to a large number of loudspeakers placed in extremities of the performance venue." The Berlin State Opera and the Hummingbird Centre in Toronto use a LARES system. The Ahmanson Theatre in Los Angeles, the Royal National Theatre in London, and the Vivian Beaumont Theater in New York City use the SIAP system.

Feedback systems with electronic reverberators: Feedback acoustic enhancement systems include Meyer Constellation (formerly VRAS) (Variable Room Acoustics System) which uses "...different algorithms based on microphones placed around the room." Yamaha's AFC3 Active Field Control system which "enhances the architectural acoustic characteristics of a room and optimizes reverberation time performance." Also XLNT's MCR system (Multiple Channel Reverberation). L-Acoustics Ambiance is also a hybrid acoustic enhancement solution that combines both in-line and regenerative acoustic technologies to transform the acoustic properties of a building or venue to meet the needs of varying desired scenarios, whether it's a small acoustic performance or a large, fully amplified event. Ambiance uses an array of strategically placed microphones to capture the existing acoustical energy of an architectural space, then processes these signals, giving the sound designer the ability to extend the Reverberation Time (RT60) of a space while also controlling additional acoustic energy in the form of early reflections.

Feedback systems without electronic reverberators: CARMEN developed by CSTB comprises a number of electro-acoustic active cells (approximately from 16 to 40), each of them being composed of a microphone, an electronic filtering unit, a power amplifier and a loudspeaker. Placed around the walls and ceiling of the auditorium, the cells form virtual walls depending on the architecture and the acoustic problem to solve. They only communicate between each other by the acoustic way. Another newer variant for smaller halls is CARMENCITA.
