= Forensic audio enhancement =

Forensic audio enhancement is the scientific analysis and improvement of audio clarity, typically to improve intelligibility.

Although the term is "enhancement", the process is almost entirely composed of filtering away unwanted sounds in order to leave a more understandable version.

== Admissibility as evidence ==
- The processes applied must adhere to the standards of evidence in order to be admissible in a court of law. The audio expert must be able to document the steps they took, these steps must be replicable, no data can be created, and no judgment based edits or deletions can occur. Changes in pitch or speed can also render a recording inadmissible.
- The courts may require proper chain of custody documentation with this evidence. This includes appropriate precautions to ensure that the evidence is properly protected and stored.
- If the enhancement is performed using commercially available software, proof of vendor specified training and proficiency may be required.
