= Ringing out =

Ringing out is a process in audio engineering technique used to prevent audio feedback between on-stage microphones and loudspeakers, and to maximize gain before feedback. Depending on the acoustics of a venue, certain frequencies may be resonant and thus will be more prone to feedback.

To ring out a room, a sound technician will raise the gain or fader controls on a mixing desk to induce an audio system to feedback. Once feedback occurs, the technician uses an equalizer, usually a graphic equalizer, to reduce the gain at the frequency of the feedback. The frequency of the feedback can be identified using a spectrum analyzer. This is repeated until feedback is sufficiently reduced without compromising the quality of the sound.

Ringing out is particularly important for the stage monitor system. While the performer or musician is usually behind the main PA system, the monitors are so they can hear themselves. As such, a microphone is much more likely to feedback through the monitor loudspeakers than the main PA.

Ringing out can become quite complex when working with a large number of microphones and monitors. Indeed, with larger touring acts, one of the major advantages of using in-ear monitors is the minimal ringing out that needs to be done.

Hardware exists that can perform many of the same functions that ringing out provides, such as feedback suppression and room optimization.
