= Audio power amplifier =

Audio amplifier with power output sufficient to drive a loudspeaker

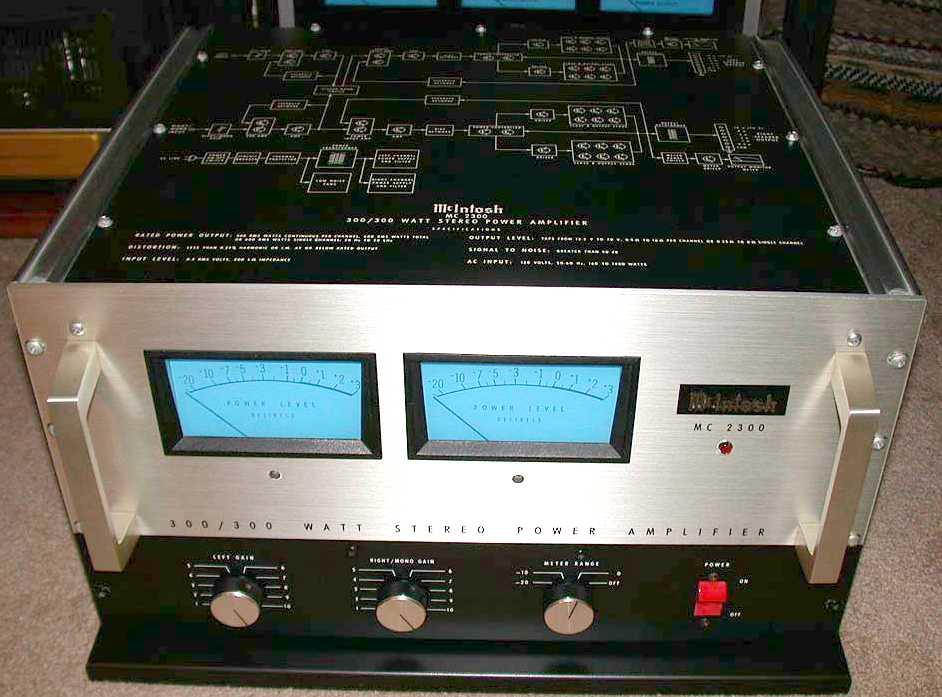
Audio stereo power amplifier made by McIntosh

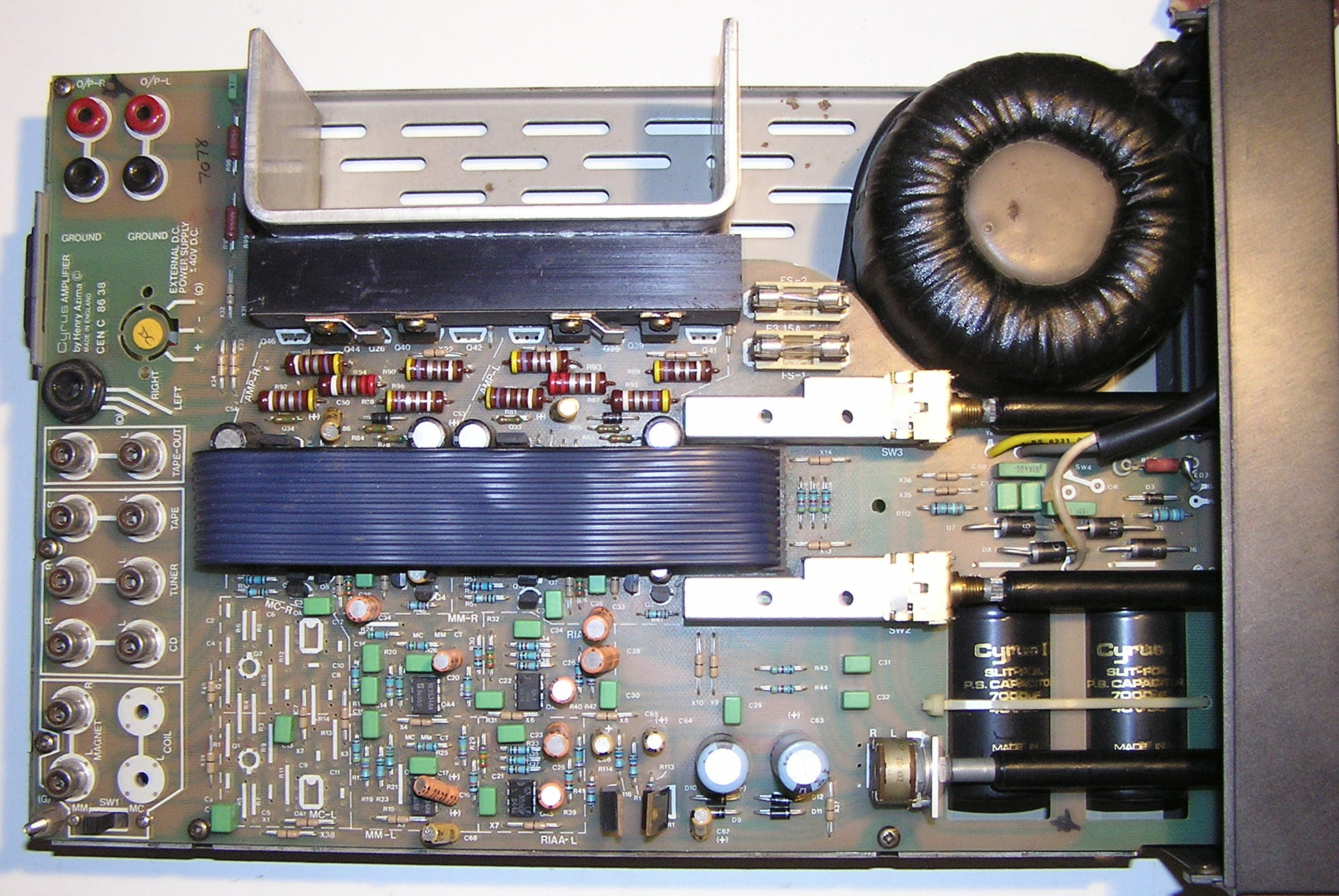
The internal view of a Mission Cyrus One hi-fi integrated amplifier (1984)

An audio power amplifier (or power amp) amplifies low-power electronic audio signals, such as the signal from a radio receiver or an electric guitar pickup, to a level that is high enough for driving loudspeakers or headphones. Audio power amplifiers are found in all manner of sound systems, including sound reinforcement, public address, home audio systems and musical instrument amplifiers like guitar amplifiers. It is the final electronic stage in a typical audio playback chain before the signal is sent to the loudspeakers.

The preceding stages in such a chain are low-power audio amplifiers, which perform tasks like pre-amplification of the signal, equalization, and mixing different input signals. The inputs can also be any number of audio sources like record players, CD players, digital audio players and cassette players. Most audio power amplifiers require these low-level inputs, which are line level.

While the input signal to an audio power amplifier, such as the signal from an electric guitar, may measure only a few hundred microwatts, its output may be a few watts for small consumer electronics devices, such as clock radios, tens or hundreds of watts for a home stereo system, several thousand watts for a nightclub's sound system or tens of thousands of watts for a large rock concert sound reinforcement system. While power amplifiers are available in standalone units, typically aimed at the hi-fi audiophile market (a niche market) of audio enthusiasts and sound reinforcement system professionals, many consumer electronics audio products such as an integrated amplifier, a receiver, clock radios, boomboxes and televisions have both a preamplifier and a power amplifier contained in a single chassis.

== History ==
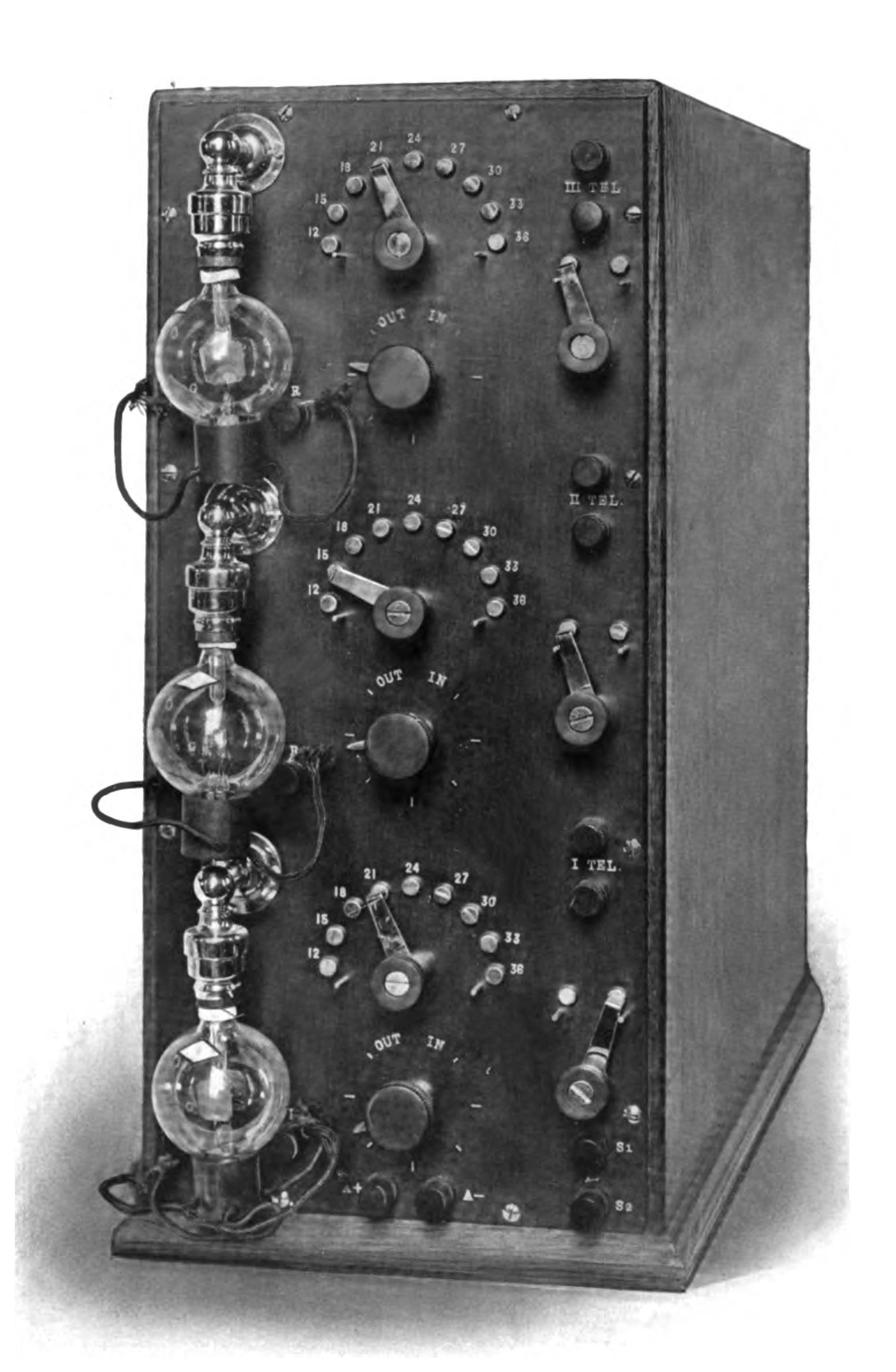
De Forest's prototype audio amplifier of 1914

The audio amplifier was invented around 1912 by Lee de Forest. This was made possible by his invention of the first practical amplifying electrical component, the triode vacuum tube (or "valve" in British English) in 1907. The triode was a three-terminal device with a control grid that can modulate the flow of electrons from the filament to the plate. The triode vacuum amplifier was used to make the first AM radio. Early audio power amplifiers were based on vacuum tubes and some of these achieved notably high audio quality (e.g., the Williamson amplifier of 1947–9).

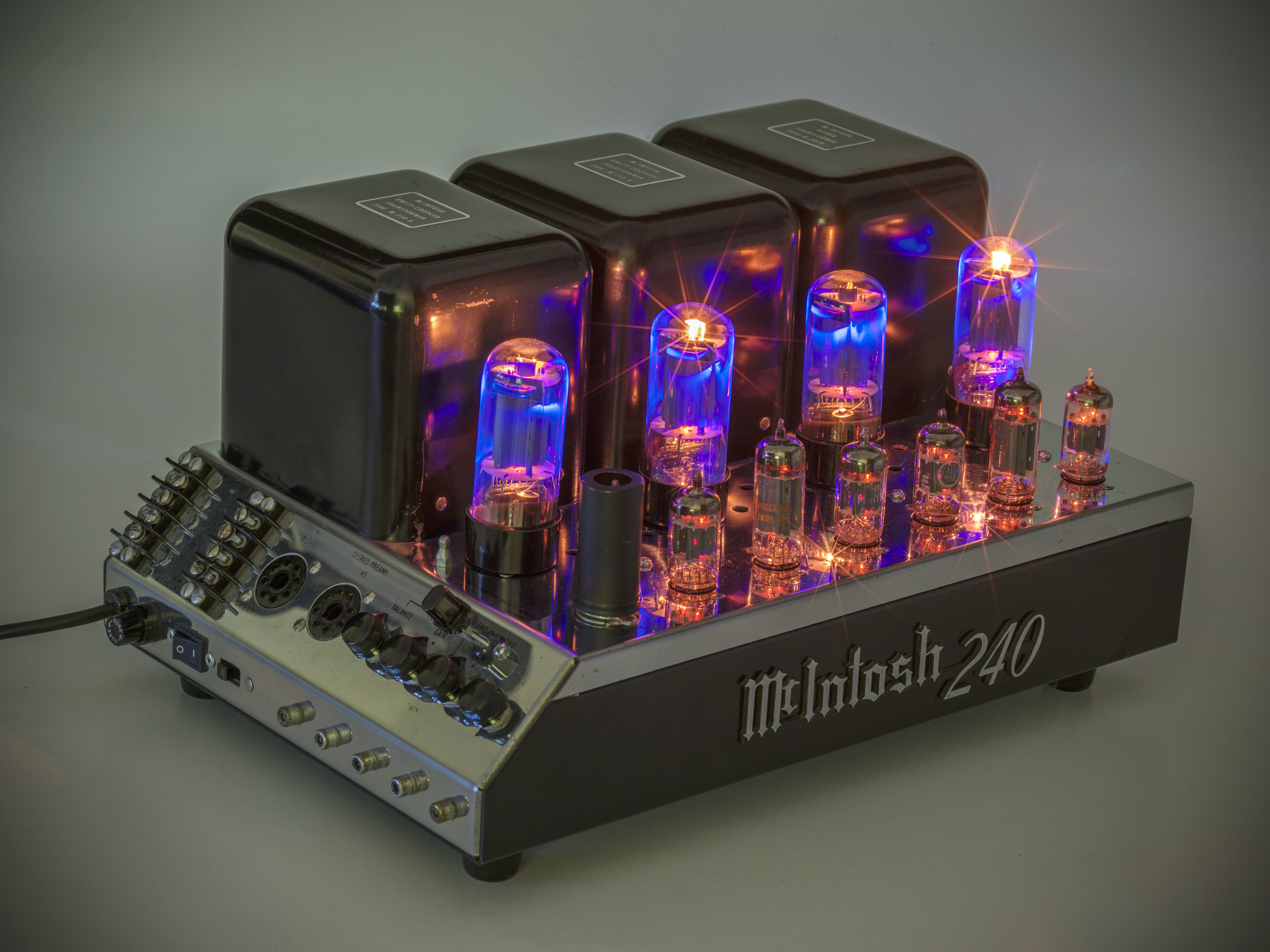
McIntosh MC240 from 1961, with exposed vacuum tubes

Audio power amplifiers based on transistors became practical with the wide availability of inexpensive transistors in the late 1960s. Since the 1970s, most modern audio amplifiers are based on solid-state transistors, especially the bipolar junction transistor (BJT) and the metal–oxide–semiconductor field-effect transistor (MOSFET). Transistor-based amplifiers are lighter in weight, more reliable and require less maintenance than tube amplifiers.

The MOSFET was invented at Bell Labs between 1955 and 1960. was adapted into a power MOSFET for audio by Jun-ichi Nishizawa at Tohoku University in 1974. Power MOSFETs were soon manufactured by Yamaha for their hi-fi audio amplifiers. JVC, Pioneer Corporation, Sony and Toshiba also began manufacturing amplifiers with power MOSFETs in 1974. In 1977, Hitachi introduced the LDMOS (lateral diffused MOS), a type of power MOSFET. Hitachi was the only LDMOS manufacturer between 1977 and 1983, during which time LDMOS was used in audio power amplifiers from manufacturers such as HH Electronics (V-series) and Ashly Audio, and were used for music and public address systems. Class-D amplifiers became successful in the mid-1980s when low-cost, fast-switching MOSFETs were made available. Many transistor amps use MOSFET devices in their power sections, because their distortion curve is more tube-like.

In the 2010s, there are still audio enthusiasts, musicians (particularly electric guitarists, electric bassists, Hammond organ players and Fender Rhodes electric piano players, among others), audio engineers and music producers who prefer tube-based amplifiers, and what is perceived as a "warmer" tube sound.

== Design parameters ==
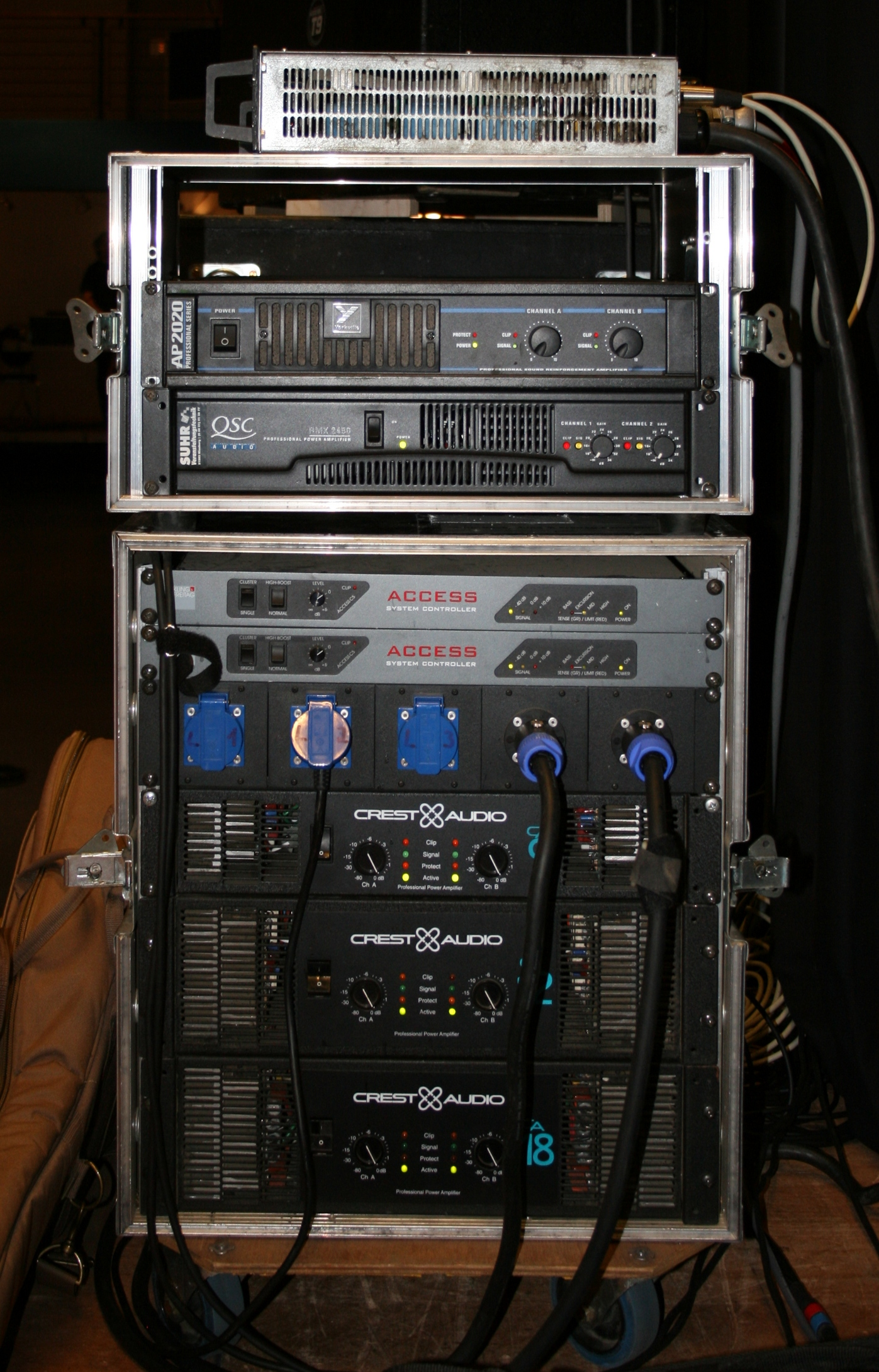
Five rack-mounted audio power amplifiers used in a sound reinforcement system

Key design parameters for audio power amplifiers are frequency response, gain, noise, and distortion. These are interdependent; increasing gain often leads to undesirable increases in noise and distortion. While negative feedback actually reduces the gain, it also reduces distortion. Most audio amplifiers are linear amplifiers operating in class AB.

Until the 1970s, most amplifiers used vacuum tubes. During the 1970s, tube amps were increasingly replaced with transistor-based amplifiers, which were lighter in weight, more reliable, and lower maintenance. Nevertheless, tube preamplifiers are still sold in niche markets, such as with home hi-fi enthusiasts, audio engineers and music producers (who use tube preamplifiers in studio recordings to "warm up" microphone signals) and electric guitarists, electric bassists and Hammond organ players, of whom a minority continue to use tube preamps, tube power amps and tube effects units. While hi-fi enthusiasts and audio engineers doing live sound or monitoring tracks in the studio typically seek out amplifiers with the lowest distortion, electric instrument players in genres such as blues, rock music and heavy metal music, among others, use tube amplifiers because they like the natural overdrive that tube amps produce when pushed hard.

The class-D amplifier, which is much more efficient than class-AB amplifiers, is now widely used in consumer electronics audio products, bass amplifiers and sound reinforcement system gear, as class-D amplifiers are much lighter in weight and produce much less heat, but may introduce some noise.

== Filters and preamplifiers ==
Since modern digital devices, including CD and DVD players, radio receivers and tape decks already provide a "flat" signal at line level, the preamp is not needed other than as a volume control and source selector. One alternative to a separate preamp is to simply use passive volume and switching controls, sometimes integrated into a power amplifier to form an integrated amplifier.

== Power output stages ==
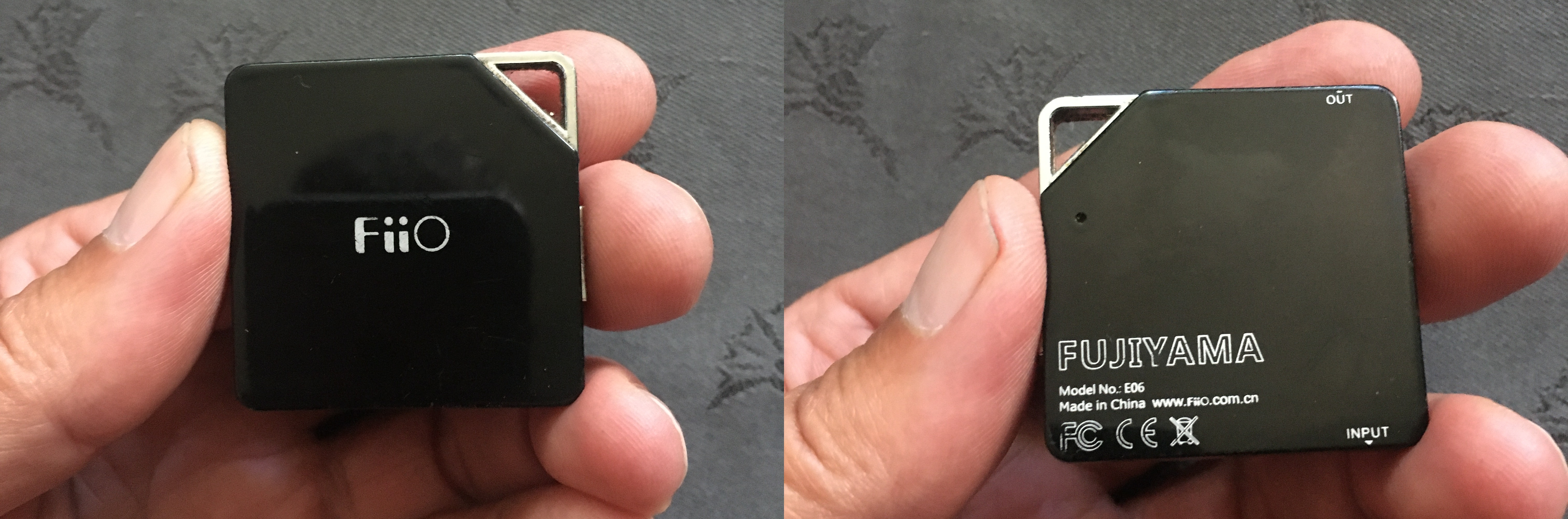
A micro audio amplifier for boosting the output of line level sources to headphones or small speakers. Edge length 4 cm, mass 16 g, power output about 100 mW into a 32 Ω load.

The final stage of amplification, after preamplifiers, is the output stage, where the highest demands are placed on the transistors or tubes. For this reason, the design choices made around the output device (for single-ended output stages, such as in single-ended triode amplifiers) or devices (for push-pull output stages), such as the class of operation of the output devices is often taken as the description of the whole power amplifier. For example, a class-B amplifier will probably have just the high power output devices operating cut off for half of each cycle, while the other devices (such as differential amplifier, voltage amplifier and possibly even driver transistors) operate in class A. In a transformerless output stage, the devices are essentially in series with the power supply and output load (such as a loudspeaker), possibly via some large capacitor and/or small resistances.

== Further developments ==
=== Transient intermodulation distortion ===
For some years following the introduction of solid-state amplifiers, their perceived sound did not have the excellent audio quality of the best valve audio amplifiers. This led audiophiles to believe that tube sound had an intrinsic quality due to the vacuum tube technology itself. In 1970, Matti Otala published a paper on transient distortion. Transient distortion later became known as transient intermodulation distortion (TIM). Two years later, in a 1972 paper, Matti Otala reported that TIM was found to occur during very rapid increases in amplifier output voltage. At the time, some thought TIM was a previously unobserved form of distortion, only to be revealed by other authors in later papers that TIM was, in actuality not unique or unobserved, since the already available measurement techniques revealed that TIM was actually slew rate distortion, which in turn was always revealed as traditionally measured harmonic distortion rising in the higher frequencies, as well as by traditionally measured intermodulation distortion. Papers also later revealed that TIM distortion was triggered not just by transients, but also by steady state sine tone measurements. A claim in Otala's 1970 paper that a large open-loop gain (creating a high level of negative feedback) was a cause of transient distortion, was later updated when Cordell concluded just the opposite, concluding that a small open loop bandwidth combined with a large open loop gain does not cause TIM. Further publications by Otala and other authors found the solution for TIM distortion, including increasing slew rate, decreasing preamp frequency bandwidth, and the insertion of a lag compensation circuit in the input stage of the amplifier in a way that makes the input stage more linear.

=== Baxandall Theorem ===
The next step in advanced design was the Baxandall Theorem, created by Peter Baxandall in England. This theorem introduced the concept of comparing the ratio between the input distortion and the output distortion of an amplifier. This new idea helped audio design engineers to better evaluate the distortion processes within an amplifier.

=== Baxandall Effect ===
By applying negative feedback, the Baxandall Effect can come into play, where, as the level of negative feedback is increased over a limited range, the 2nd harmonic distortion product is reduced as expected, but at the same time, the higher-order harmonic distortion products are increased instead. This has led to the myth that high levels of negative feedback are bad. However, as the level of negative feedback is increased beyond approximately 20 dB, all distortion products are further reduced, demonstrating that such higher levels of negative feedback have no downsides.

== Applications ==
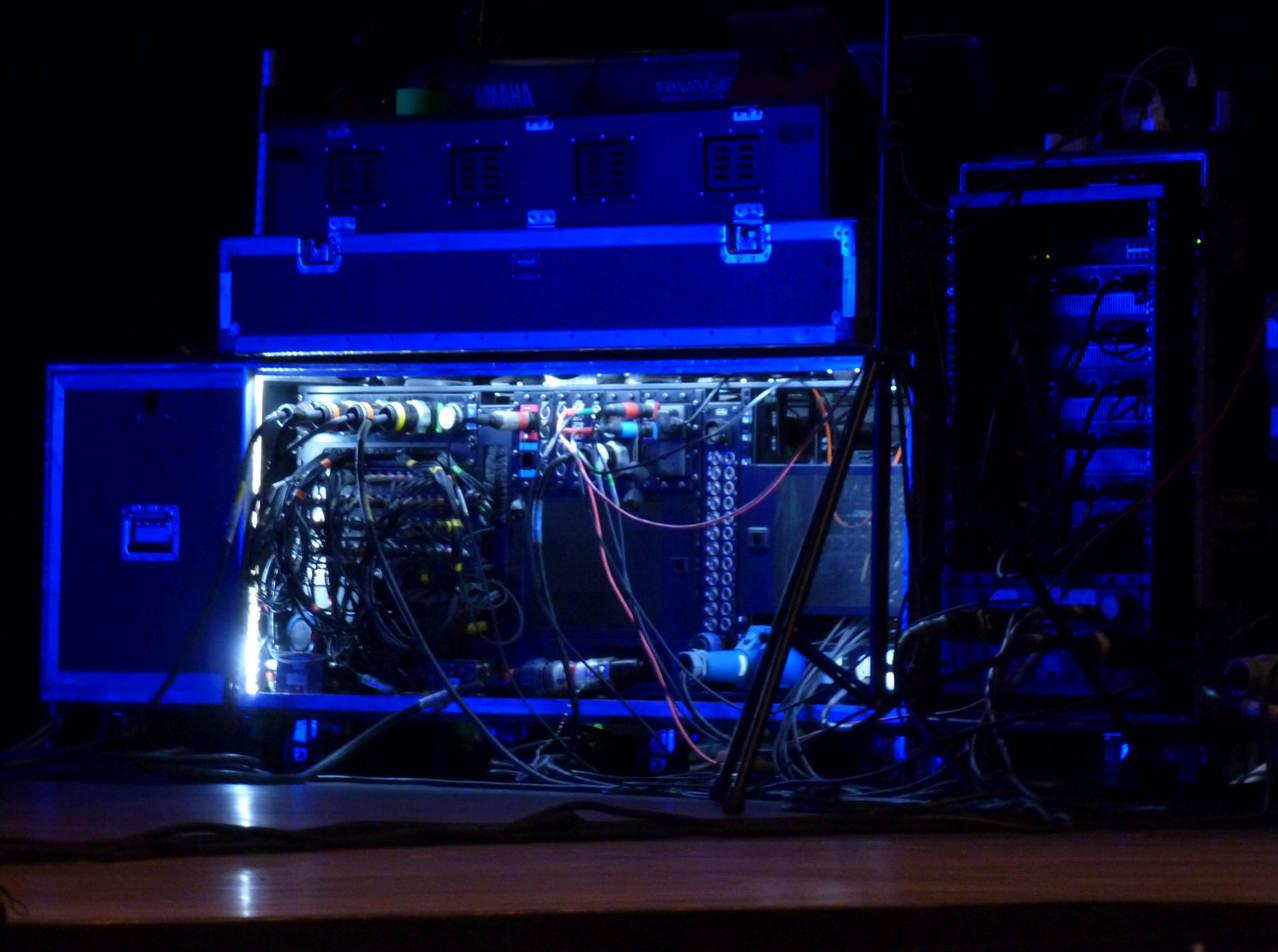
Rear panel of a medium-sized sound reinforcement system located at one side of the stage at a pop concert. The setup includes the mixing console for the sound engineer (standing behind) and the power amplifiers, which are partly stacked in a 19-inch rack on the right.

Important applications include public address systems, theatrical and concert sound reinforcement systems, and domestic systems such as a stereo or home-theatre system. Instrument amplifiers including guitar amplifiers and electric keyboard amplifiers also use audio power amplifiers. In some cases, the power amplifier for an instrument amplifier is integrated into a single amplifier "head" which contains a preamplifier, tone controls, and electronic effects. These components may be mounted in a wooden speaker cabinet to create a "combo amplifier". Musicians with unique performance needs and/or a need for very powerful amplification may create a custom setup with separate rackmount preamplifiers, equalizers, and a power amplifier mounted in a 19" road case.

Power amplifiers are available in standalone units, which are used by hi-fi audio enthusiasts and designers of public address systems (PA systems) and sound reinforcement systems. A hi-fi user of power amplifiers may have a stereo power amplifier to drive left and right speakers and a single-channel (mono) power amplifier to drive a subwoofer. The number of power amplifiers used in a sound reinforcement setting depends on the size of the venue. A small coffeehouse may have a single power amp driving two PA speakers. A nightclub may have several power amps for the main speakers, one or more power amps for the monitor speakers (pointing towards the band) and an additional power amp for the subwoofer. A stadium concert may have a large number of power amps mounted in racks. Most consumer electronics sound products, such as TVs, boom boxes, home cinema sound systems, Casio and Yamaha electronic keyboards, "combo" guitar amps and car stereos have power amplifiers integrated inside the chassis of the main product.

== See also ==
- FET amplifier – Device using a field effect transistor
- Instrument amplifier – Amplifier with loudspeaker for use with musical instruments
- OCL amplifier – Audio amplifier with direct-coupled capacitorless output
