= Stage monitor system =

Sound reinforcement for performers

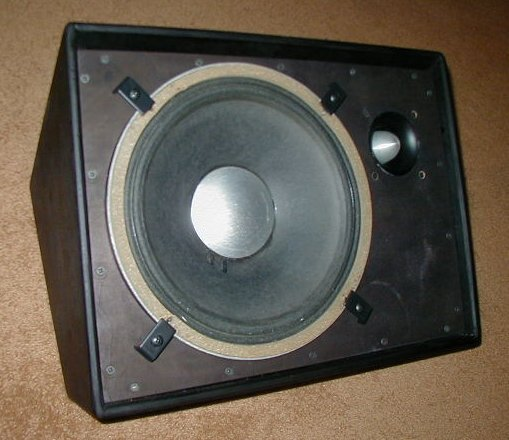
A JBL floor monitor speaker cabinet with a 12" woofer and a "bullet" tweeter. Typically, the speaker would be covered with a metal grille to protect it.

A stage monitor system is a set of performer-facing loudspeakers called monitor speakers, stage monitors, floor monitors, wedges, or foldbacks on stage during live music performances in which a sound reinforcement system is used to amplify a performance for the audience. The monitor system allows musicians to hear themselves and fellow band members clearly.

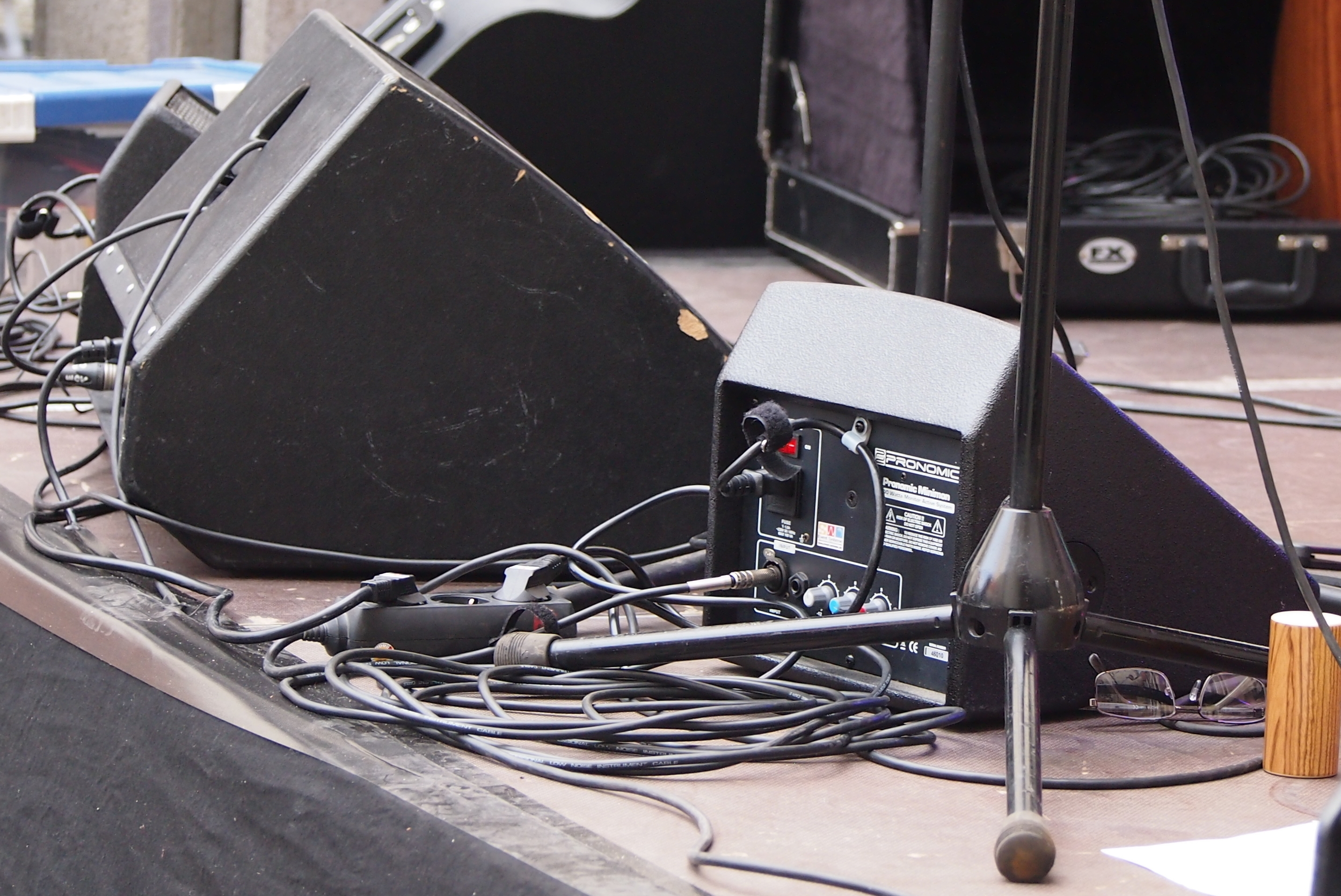
Stage monitors plugged with jack and XLR cables, receiving the sound from the main console. In the 2010s and 2020s, stage monitors are generally powered.

The sound at popular music and rock music concerts is amplified with power amplifiers through a sound reinforcement system. With the exception of the smallest venues, such as coffeehouses, most mid- to large-sized venues use two sound systems. The main or front-of-house (FOH) system amplifies the onstage sounds for the main audience. The monitor system is driven by a mix separate from the front-of-house system. This mix typically highlights the vocals and acoustic instruments so they can be heard over the electronic instruments and drums.

Monitor systems have a range of sizes and complexity. A small pub or nightclub may have a single monitor speaker on stage so that the lead vocalist can hear their singing and the signal for the monitor may be produced on the same mixing console and audio engineer as the front-of-house mix. A stadium rock concert may use a large number of monitor wedges and a separate mixing console and engineer on or beside the stage for the monitors. In the most sophisticated and expensive monitor set-ups, each onstage performer can ask the sound engineer for a separate monitor mix for separate monitors. For example, the lead singer can choose to hear mostly their voice in the monitor in front of them and the guitarist can choose to hear mostly the bassist and drummer in their monitor.

== Role ==
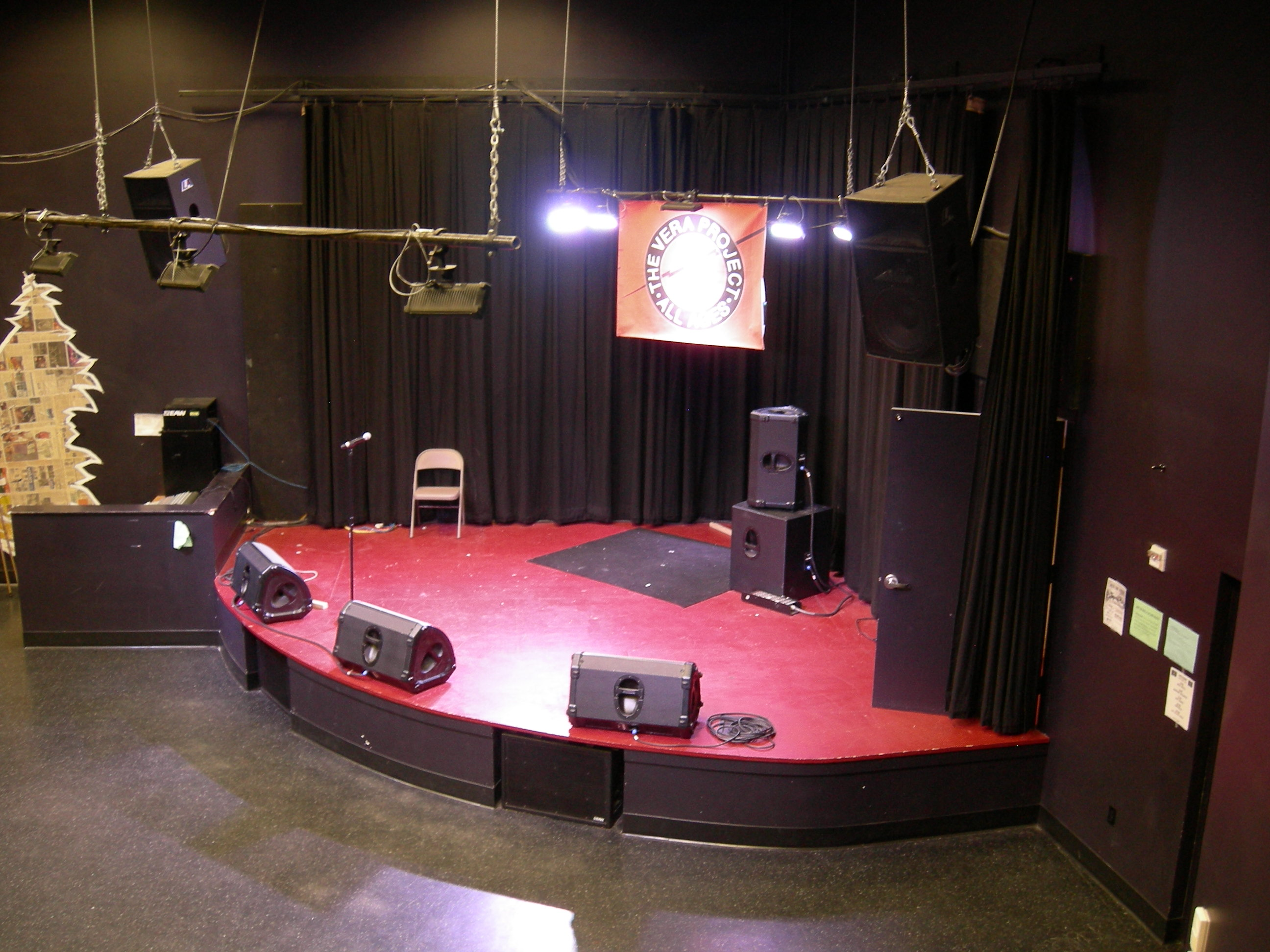
This small venue's stage shows an example of a typical monitor speaker set-up: there are three "wedge" monitors directed towards the area of the stage where singers and instrumentalists will be performing. The drummer has both a subwoofer cabinet (for monitoring the bass drum and the electric bass) and a "wedge"-style cabinet for monitoring vocals and mid- or high-frequency sounds.

For live sound reproduction during popular music concerts in mid- to large-size venues, there are typically two complete loudspeaker systems and PA systems (also called sound reinforcement systems): the main or front-of-house system and the monitor or foldback system. Each system consists of a mixing console, sound processing equipment, power amplifiers, and speakers.

Without a foldback system, the sound that on-stage performers would hear from front of house would be the reverberated reflections bouncing from the rear wall of the venue. The naturally reflected sound is delayed and distorted, which could, for example, cause the singer to sing out of time with the band. In situations with poor or absent foldback mixes, vocalists may end up singing off-tune or out of time with the band.

The monitor system reproduces the sounds of the performance and directs them towards the onstage performers (typically using wedge-shaped monitor speaker cabinets), to help them hear the instruments and vocals. A separately mixed signal is often routed to the foldback speaker to allow musicians to hear their performance as the audience hears it or in a way that helps improve their performance. More frequently, major professional bands and singers often use small in-ear monitors rather than onstage monitor speakers. The two systems usually share microphones and direct inputs using a splitter microphone snake.

The front-of-house system, which provides the amplified sound for the audience, will typically use a number of powerful amplifiers driving a range of large, heavy-duty loudspeaker cabinets, including low-frequency speaker cabinets called subwoofers, full-range speaker cabinets, and high-range horns. A coffeehouse or small bar where singers perform while accompanying themselves on acoustic guitar may have a relatively small, low-powered PA system, such as a pair of two 200 watt powered speakers. A large club may use several power amplifiers to provide 1000 to 2000 watts of power to the main speakers. An outdoor rock concert may use large racks containing multiple power amplifiers to provide 10,000 or more watts.

The monitor system in a coffeehouse or singer-songwriter stage for a small bar may be a single 100-watt powered monitor wedge. In the smallest PA systems, the performer may set their own main and monitor sound levels with a simple powered mixing console. The simplest monitor systems consist of a single monitor speaker for the lead vocalist, which amplifies their singing voice so that they can hear it clearly.

In a large club where rock bands play, the monitor system may use racks of power amplifiers and four to six monitor speakers to provide 500 to 1000 watts of power to the monitor speakers. At an outdoor rock concert, there may be several thousand watts of power going to a complex monitor system that includes wedge-shaped cabinets for vocalists and larger cabinets called sidefill cabinets to help the musicians to hear their playing and singing.

Larger clubs and concert venues typically use a more complex type of monitor system, which has two or three different monitor speakers and mixes for the different performers, e.g., vocalists and instrumentalists. Each monitor mix contains a blend of different vocals and instruments, and an amplified speaker is placed in front of the performer. This way, the lead vocalist can have a mix that forefronts their vocals, the backup singers can have a mix that emphasizes their backup vocals, and the rhythm section members can have a mix that emphasizes the bass and drums. In most clubs and larger venues, sound engineers and technicians control the mixing consoles for the main and monitor systems, adjusting the tone, sound levels, and overall volume of the performance.

== History ==
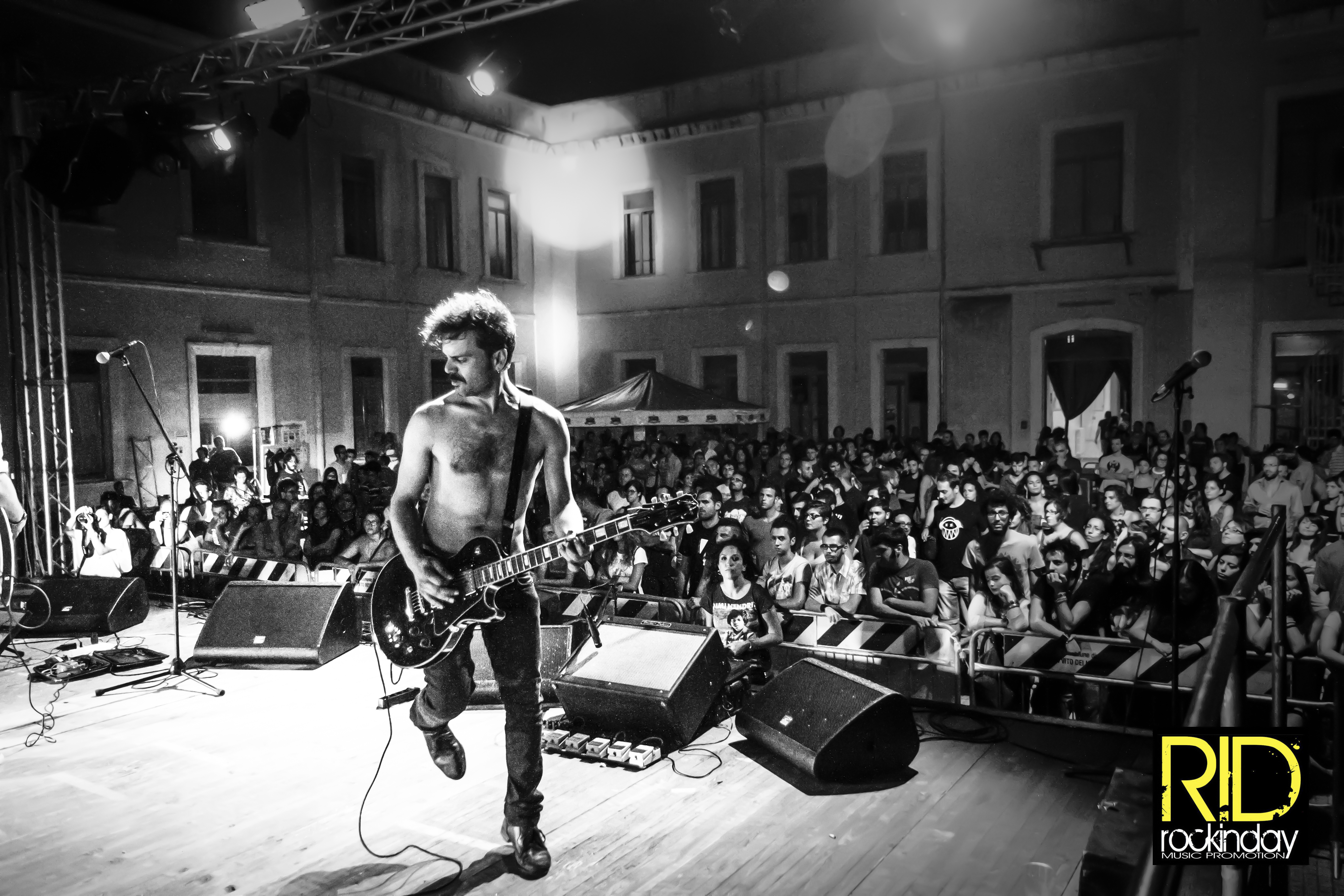
A rock band stage clearly shows the stage monitors (Italy, 2013).

In the early 1960s, many pop and rock concerts were performed without monitor speakers. In the early 1960s, PA systems were typically low-powered units that could only be used for vocals. The PA systems during this era were not used to amplify the electric instruments on stage; each performer was expected to bring a powerful amplifier and speaker system to make their electric guitar, electric bass, Hammond organ or electric piano loud enough to hear on stage and to fill the venue with sound.

With these systems, singers could only hear their vocals by listening to the reflected sound from the audience-facing front-of-house speakers. This was not an effective way to hear one's vocals because of the associated delay, which made it hard to sing in rhythm with the band and in tune.

The use of performer-facing loudspeakers for foldback or monitoring may have been developed independently by sound engineers in different cities who were trying to resolve this problem. The earliest recorded instance that a loudspeaker was used for foldback (monitoring) was for Judy Garland at the San Francisco Civic Auditorium on September 13, 1961; provided by McCune Sound Service.

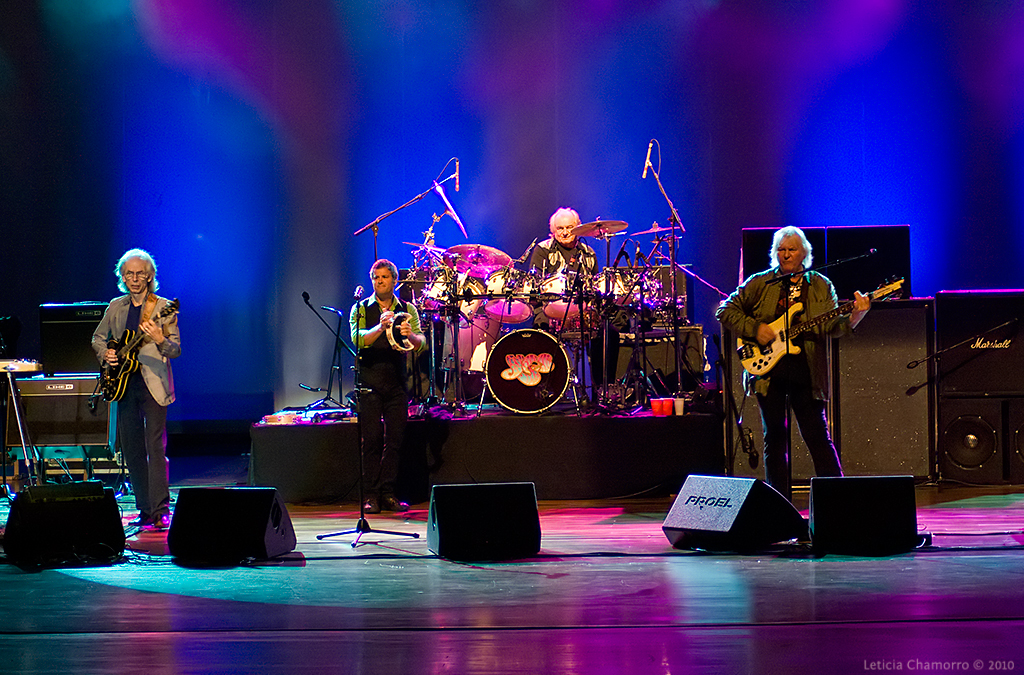
Stage monitors at a Yes concert in Paraguay in 2010

Early stage monitors were simply speakers on each side of the stage pointed at the performers, driven by the same mix as the FOH; audio mixers used in PAs at the time rarely had auxiliary send mixes. Today, these would be called sidefill monitors. F.B. "Duke" Mewborn of Atlanta's Baker Audio used left and right arrays of Altec loudspeakers to cover the audience and to serve sidefill duties for the Beatles at Atlanta Stadium on August 18, 1965. Bill Hanley working with Neil Young of Buffalo Springfield pioneered the concept of a speaker on the floor angled up at the performer with directional microphones to allow louder volumes with less feedback.

In the 1970s, Bob Cavin, chief engineer at McCune Sound, designed the first monitor mixer designed expressly for stage monitoring. He also designed the first stage monitor loudspeaker that had two different listening angles.

The introduction of monitor speakers made it much easier for performers to hear their singing and playing on stage, which helped to improve the quality of live performances. A singer who has a good monitor system does not have to strain their voice to try to be heard. Monitor systems also helped rhythm section instrumentalists hear each other and thus improve their playing together, even on a huge stage (e.g., at a stadium rock concert) with the musicians far apart.

From the late 1960s to the 1980s, most monitor speaker cabinets used an external power amplifier. In the 1990s and 2000s, clubs increasingly used powered monitors, which contain an integrated power amplifier. Another trend of the 2000s was the blurring of the lines between monitor speaker cabinets and regular speaker cabinets; many companies began selling wedge-shaped full-range speakers intended to be used for either monitors or main public address purposes.

== The stage monitoring system ==
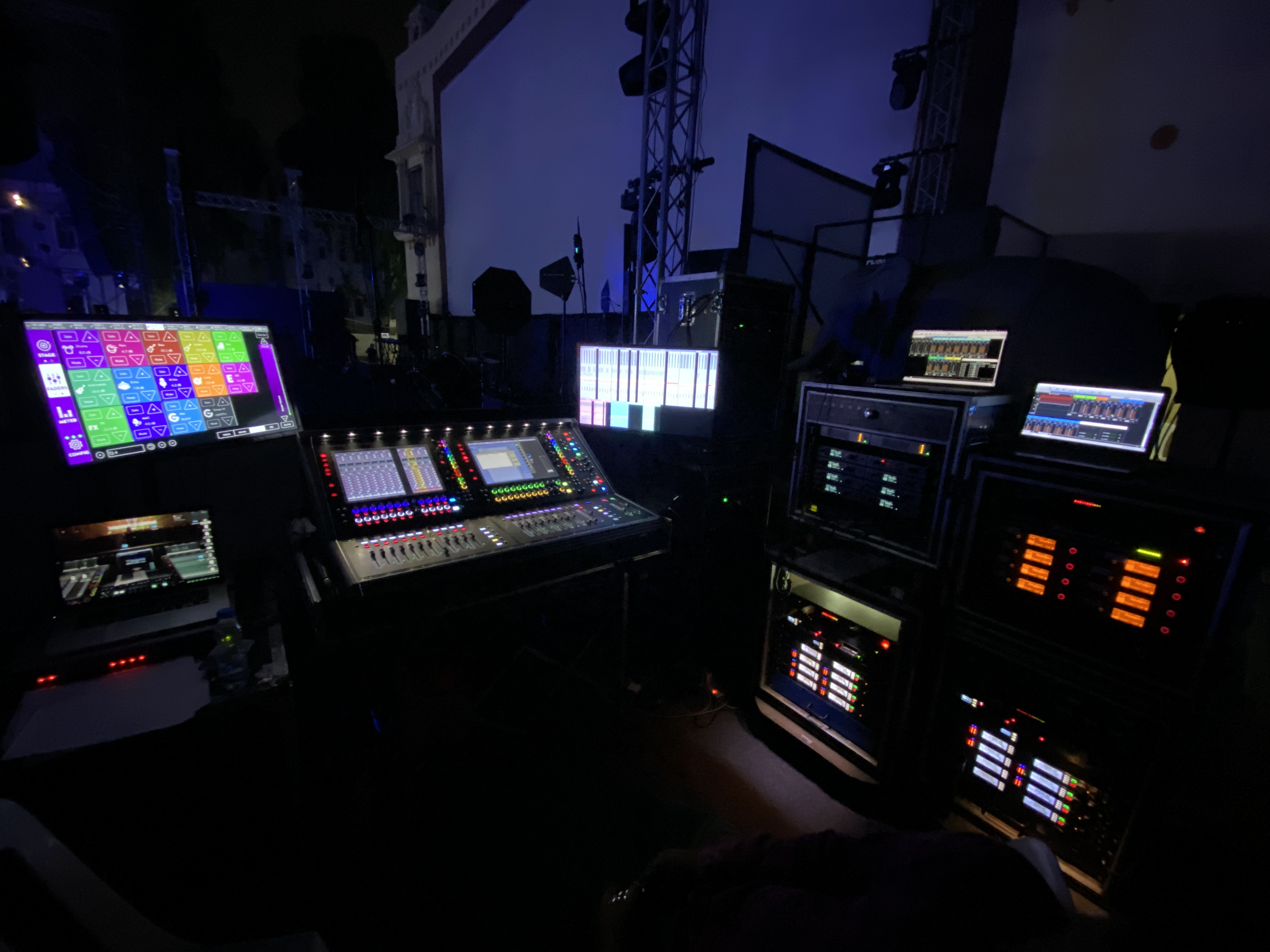
Monitor mixing setup, Hyderabad, 2021.

The monitor system consists of the monitor mixer, equalization or other signal processing, amplifiers, and monitor speakers on stage pointing at the performers. Microphones and direct inputs are shared with the front-of-house system.

=== Front of house auxiliary speaker ===
The simplest monitor system is a speaker pointed at the performer fed from the FOH mix. This might be used by one or two performers in a coffee house, small club, or small house of worship. In this setting, a two-channel powered mixer might be used with one channel powering the main speakers and one channel powering the monitor speaker. The mixer would be on stage with the performers setting their own levels.

=== Monitors mixed from front of house ===
A common monitor setup for smaller venues is one that uses one or more separate auxiliary mixes or sub-mixes on the FOH mixing console. These mixes are pre-fader so that changes to the FOH levels do not significantly affect what the performers hear on stage. The monitor mixes drive dedicated monitor equalizers and signal processors which in turn drive dedicated monitor amplifiers that power the monitor speakers. The FOH mixer is operated by an audio engineer who must mix for the audience and also tend to the needs of the musicians on stage.

=== Separate monitor mixer ===
Larger venues will use a separate system for monitors with its own mixer and monitor sound engineer. In this case, a microphone splitter is used to split the signal from the microphones and direct inputs between the monitor mixer and the FOH mixer.

This splitter may be part of the microphone snake, or it may be built into the monitor mixer. With a separate monitor system, there may be 8, 12, or more separate monitor mixes, typically one per performer. Each monitor mix contains a blend of different vocals and instruments. This way, the lead vocalist can have a mix that forefronts their vocals, the backup singers can have a mix that emphasizes their backup vocals and the rhythm section members can have a mix that emphasizes the bass and drums. In addition, there may be side-fill monitors to provide sound for areas on stage not covered by the floor wedges.

=== Distributed monitoring ===
An innovation first used in recording studios is the use of small mixers placed next to each performer so that they can adjust their own mix. The mixers are driven by sub-mixes from the FOH console, with each sub-mix having a subset of the inputs on stage. For example, mix 1 vocals, mix 2 guitars, mix 3 keyboards, and mix 4 drums and bass. The performers can then adjust these four groups to their own preferences. If the balance between several vocals or the balance between bass and drums needed to be changed, the sound engineer would have to change it at the main mixing console.

A variation on this is to add an additional input to each mixer, which is the performer's instrument or vocal microphone, so that each performer can add more of their performance to the other sub-mixes. This approach has been called more me in the monitors.

With advances in digital technology, it is now possible to transmit multiple audio channels over a single Ethernet cable. This allows the distribution of most or all of the input sources to each performer's mixer, giving them complete control over their mix.

Distributed monitor mixers are most successful with headphones or in-ear monitors. If monitor speakers are used, feedback problems are common when the performer turns their microphone up too loud.

== Monitor equipment ==
=== Monitor speakers ===
Monitor speakers often include a single full-range loudspeaker and a horn in a cabinet. Monitor speakers have numerous features that facilitate their transportation and protection, including handles, metal corner protectors, sturdy felt covering or paint and a metal grille to protect the speaker. Monitor speakers are normally heavy-duty speakers that can accept high input power to create high volumes and withstand extreme electrical and physical abuse.

There are two types of monitors: passive monitors consist of a loudspeaker and horn in a cabinet and must be plugged into an external power amplifier; active monitors have a loudspeaker, horn and a power amplifier in a single cabinet, which means the signal from the mixing console can be plugged straight into the monitor speaker.

A recent trend has been to build the amplifier and associated sound processing equipment into the monitor speaker enclosure. These monitors are called active or powered monitors. This design allows amplifiers with the right amount of power to be custom made for the speakers. Active monitors are typically bi-amped and have an active crossover with custom equalization to tune the monitor to have a flat frequency response. One of the first examples of this type of monitor is the Meyer Sound Laboratories UM-1P.

Monitor speakers come in two forms: floor monitors and side-fill monitors.

Floor monitors are compact speakers with an angled back that is laid on the floor. This angled shape gives the floor monitor its other name of wedge. The angle is typically 30 degrees, which points the speaker back and up towards the performer. These speakers may also be single small speakers, which are sometimes mounted on a microphone stand to get them closer to the performers' ears. More often, they are heavy-duty two-way systems with a woofer and a high-frequency horn. A small floor monitor might use a 12" woofer with an integrated high-frequency horn or driver combination. A large floor monitor might use one or two 15" woofers and a high-frequency driver attached to a high-frequency horn. The speaker might use a passive crossover or might be bi-amped with an active crossover and separate amplifiers for the woofer and high-frequency driver.

Side-fill monitors are monitors that sit upright on the side of the stage and are used to provide sound to the areas of the stage not covered by the floor monitors. Side fill monitors are typically standard FOH speakers. A special case of a side fill monitor is a drum fill. Drum fills are typically large 2- or 3-way speakers with one or more large woofers capable of extremely high volumes to help drummers hear other band members over the acoustic sound of their drums.

=== Monitor amplifiers ===
If the amplifier is not built into the monitor speaker enclosure, one or more external amplifiers are required to power the monitor system speakers. Robust commercial amplifiers are used here. In a simple monitor system, a single amplifier may drive all monitor speakers. In more complex scenarios where there are multiple monitor mixes, additional power is required or speakers are bi-amped, multiple amplifiers or amplifier channels are used.

=== Equalization and signal processing ===
Monitor speakers need their own equalization primarily to reduce or eliminate acoustic feedback. Acoustic feedback occurs when the time delay between the acoustic input of a microphone and the output of a monitor speaker is a multiple of the period of a frequency. When this occurs the acoustic output of the speaker is picked up by the microphone and amplified again by the monitor speaker. This is a positive feedback loop that reinforces the specific frequency, causing the speaker to howl or squeal. Equalization is used to attenuate the specific frequency that is feeding back.

The process of eliminating feedback in the monitor is called ringing out the monitors. To eliminate feedback, the monitor's level is increased until it starts to feed back. The feedback frequency is identified either by ear or by a frequency analyzer. Equalization is used to reduce that frequency. The monitor level is again increased until the next frequency starts to feed back and that frequency is eliminated. The process is repeated until feedback occurs at a previously suppressed frequency or at multiple frequencies simultaneously. If multiple monitor mixes are being used, the process has to be repeated for each separate monitor mix.

==== Graphic equalizer ====
A common equalizer used in monitor systems is the graphic equalizer. They get their name from the slide potentiometers used to adjust the level of each frequency band – the positions of the sliders side by side reads out as a frequency response graph. Graphic equalizers are fixed-frequency equalizers; The center frequency of each band can not be adjusted. The bandwidth or Q of each band can either be 1/3, 2/3 or one octave, giving a 31-band, 15-band, or 10-band for a graphic equalizer that covers the audio frequency range. The narrower the band, the more precisely the feedback frequency can be isolated. Normally, 31-band equalizers are used.

A variation on the graphic equalizer is a cut-only graphic equalizer. Since most of the time, monitor equalization involves the removal of frequencies, a cut-only equalizer can give you more precise level adjustments since the entire travel of the slider is used for reducing the level rather than wasting half the travel for boost.

One of the advantages of graphic equalizers is their simplicity of use. When ringing the monitors, a person can boost then restore each frequency band until the ringing starts. This helps you identify the feedback frequency. A drawback of graphic equalizers is the fixed frequency bands. Feedback rarely occurs on the exact center of the frequency band, so two adjacent frequency bands may have to be reduced in parallel to eliminate the feedback.

==== Parametric equalizer ====
A second type of equalizer used in monitor systems is the parametric equalizer. A parametric equalizer does not use fixed frequency bands. Instead, each frequency band can be adjusted. The center frequency can be adjusted over a several-octave range. The bandwidth of each band can be adjusted from a wide Q factor affecting several octaves to a narrow Q affecting less than an octave, and the level of the band can be adjusted. Each band may have a different frequency sweep range, with the left or lower bands sweeping the lower octaves, the middle bands sweeping the middle octaves, and the right or higher bands sweeping the higher octaves. There is normally a lot of overlap between bands. Parametric equalizers typically have 3 to 5 filtering bands per channel.

The advantage of using parametric equalizers in a monitor system is that the filter can be exactly adjusted to the specific feedback frequency, and the bandwidth of the filter can be set to be very narrow, so the adjustment affects as little of the frequency band as possible. This leads to more precise feedback elimination with less coloring of the sound. For this reason, many professionals recommend using parametric equalizers over graphic equalizers for monitors.

The process of using a parametric equalizer is different from using a graphic equalizer. When using a parametric equalizer, the first step is to choose the band to use. Normally, the first feedback frequency is in the lower mid-range so the second band would be a good choice. If the feedback frequency is in the upper mid-range, then the 3rd or 4th band would be a good choice. Next adjust the Q of the filter to be as narrow as possible and boost the frequency by 6 to 9 db. Raise the level of the monitor until it just begins to feed back, lower by 3 db or so. Now sweep the frequency of the filter until the monitor feeds back. Sweep it back and forth over the feedback frequency to find the center frequency by finding the lower and upper frequencies of the ring and setting it to the middle between these two frequencies. You may need to drop the gain on the frequency if the feedback is too loud. You repeat the process for the next and the next feedback frequencies. You may discover that the order of the frequencies does not increase left to right. For example the sequence might be 250 Hz, 800 Hz, 500 Hz, 2.6 kHz, and 1.7 kHz.

==== Notch filter ====
A notch filter is a semi-parametric equalizer where the bandwidth is set very narrow, a 1/6 octave or less, and is a cut-only filter. An example is a UREI 562 Feedback Suppressor and the Ashly SC-68 Parametric Notch Filter.

=== Monitor mixer ===
Monitor mixers provide musicians with a stage mix. The mix can be controlled by a sound engineer or by the musicians, depending on the monitor mixer's capabilities and the amount of control required. The stage mix consists of whatever vocal and instrument sources are connected to the sound reinforcement system.

Some musicians may prefer a bespoke in-ear monitor mix. This provides a more musician-controllable mix and provides them exactly what they want. This can be achieved by using a separate mixing console (the monitor mixer) and using either a split snake cable or Y-cable to allow the required instrument or vocal inputs to feed both the FOH mixer and monitor mixer.

These inputs can then be mixed on the monitor mixer, setting whatever level is required for each separate input, e.g., more guitar, less bass, more lead vocals, less backing vocals, thus providing a bespoke mix for whoever is connected to the sub-mixer. The number of inputs on the sub-mixer will determine the number of instruments and vocals that can be sub-mixed and the number of outputs determines how many musicians can be provided with a bespoke monitor mix.

== Related products ==
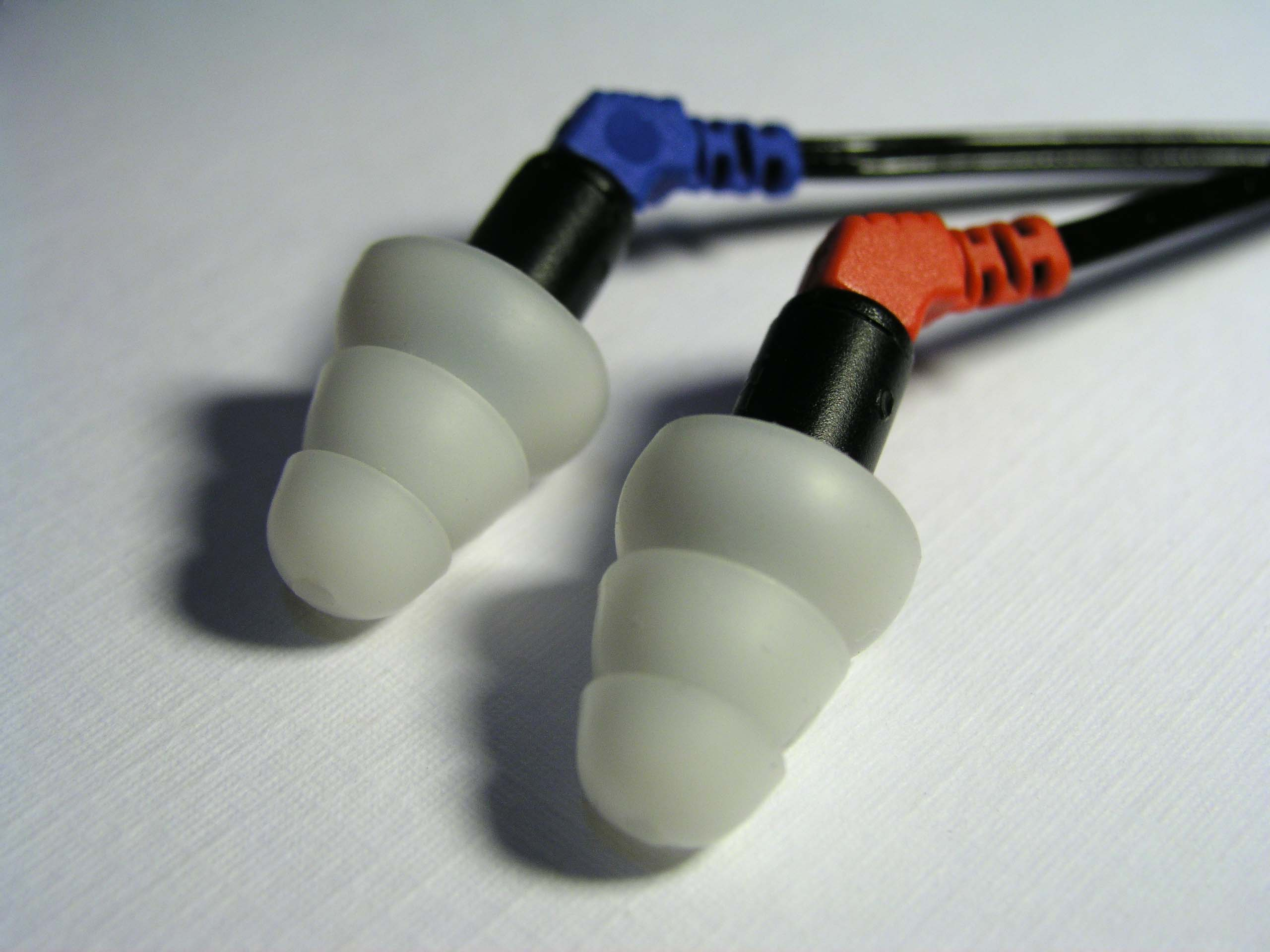
A picture of in-ear monitors which are used by on-stage performers. This particular model is the Etymotic ER-4S.

=== Headphones ===
Hardshell headphones are typically used by the audio engineer to listen to specific channels or to listen to the entire mix. While an amplified monitor speaker can also be used for this purpose, the high sound volumes in many club settings make hardshell headphones a better choice because the hard plastic shell and foam cushions help to block the room noise. Some performers may use headphones as monitors, such as drummers in pop music bands.

=== In-ear monitors ===
In the 2000s, some bands and singers, typically touring professionals, began using small in-ear-style headphone monitors. These in-ear monitors allow musicians to hear their voice and the other instruments with a clearer, more intelligible sound because the molded in-ear headphone design blocks out on-stage noise. While some in-ear monitors are universal fit designs, some companies also sell custom-made in-ear monitors, which require a fitting by an audiologist. Custom-made in-ear monitors provide an exact fit for a performer's ear.

In-ear monitors greatly reduce on-stage volume by eliminating the need for on-stage monitor wedges. This reduced on-stage volume makes it easier for the front-of-house audio engineer to get a good sound for the audience. In-ear monitors also make audio feedback howls much less likely since there are no monitor speakers. The lower on-stage volume may lead to less hearing damage for performers.

One drawback of in-ear monitors is that the singers and musicians cannot hear on-stage comments spoken away from a microphone (e.g., the bandleader turning away from the vocal mic and looking at the band and calling for an impromptu repetition of the chorus) or sounds from the audience. This issue can be rectified by placing microphones in front of the stage and mixing those into the monitor mix so that the band can hear the audience in their in-ear monitors.

=== Bass shakers ===
Drummers typically use a monitor speaker that is capable of loud bass reproduction, so that they can monitor their bass drum. Since the drums are already very loud, having a subwoofer producing a high sound pressure level can raise the overall stage volumes to uncomfortable levels for the drummer. Since much of very low bass is felt, some drummers use tactile transducers called bass shakers, butt shakers and throne shakers to monitor the timing of their bass drum. The tactile transducers are attached to the drummer's stool (throne) and the vibrations of the driver are transmitted to the body and then on to the ear in a manner similar to bone conduction. They connect to an amplifier like a normal subwoofer. They can be attached to a large flat surface (for instance, a floor or platform) to create a large low-frequency conduction area, although the transmission of low frequencies through the feet isn't as efficient as the seat.

=== Confidence monitors ===
Downstage monitors can also include teleprompters and other video display devices providing text such as lyrics or a script, sheet music, time remaining, presentation materials, or producer notes or cues to the talent discreetly out of view of the audience. They can be controlled off stage by an engineer, or self-contained and controlled by the talent via foot switch or a remote tied to a slide show presentation for the audience.

== Other meanings ==
The term foldback is sometimes applied to in-ear monitoring systems, also described as artist's cue-mixes, as they are generally set up for individual performers. Foldback may less frequently refer to current limiting protection in audio electronic amplifiers.

The term foldback has been used when referring to one or more video monitors facing a stage, in the same manner as an audio foldback monitor. The video monitor allows a person on stage to see what is behind them on screen, to see distant parties during a video conference, or to read notes or sing lyrics to a song. Other terms for this usage are confidence monitor and kicker monitor.

== See also ==
- Sidetone
