= Adaptive feedback cancellation =

Method of cancelling audio feedback

Adaptive feedback cancellation is a common method of cancelling audio feedback in a variety of electro-acoustic systems such as digital hearing aids. The time-varying acoustic feedback leakage paths can only be eliminated with adaptive feedback cancellation. When an electro-acoustic system with an adaptive feedback canceller is presented with a correlated input signal, a recurrent distortion artifact, entrainment is generated. There is a difference between system identification and feedback cancellation.

Adaptive feedback cancellation has its application in echo cancellation. The error between the desired and the actual output is taken and given as feedback to the adaptive processor for adjusting its coefficients to minimize the error.

In hearing aids, feedback arises when a part of the receiver (loudspeaker) signal is captured by the hearing aid microphone(s), gets amplified in the device and starts to loop around through the system. When feedback occurs, it results in a disturbingly loud tonal signal. Feedback is more likely to occur when the hearing aid volume is increased, when the hearing aid fitting is not in its proper position or when the hearing aid is brought close to a reflecting surface (e.g., when using a mobile phone). Adaptive feedback cancellation algorithms are techniques that estimate the transmission path between loudspeaker and microphone(s). This estimate is then used to implement a neutralizing electronic feedback path that suppresses the tonal feedback signal.

== History ==
Adaptive feedback cancellation originated during the evolution of the hearing aid. The hearing aid became digital, and as such, feedback cancellation was needed. In 1980 a directional microphone was introduced in the digital hearing aid, and adaptive feedback cancellation was created to block external noise that the microphone picked up. Today, adaptive feedback cancellation is in nearly every digital hearing aid and current research is still ongoing.

== Phases ==
Adaptive feedback cancellation follows the following process:

1. The process begins with background noise picked up by a microphone and amplified by a speaker in that same device.
2. This noise is audio feedback which is stored to later be cancelled
3. An adaptive filter uses an algorithm to maximize the amount of the stored audio feedback that can be cancelled
4. The adaptive filter is implemented in an acoustic device, and the repetition of this process is adaptive feedback cancellation

== Applications ==
=== Hearing Aids ===
Hearing aids use adaptive feedback cancellation to improve the amount of gain. When hearing aids are misplaced or turned to loud volumes, they can feedback. Noise picked up through the hearing aid's microphone creates this feedback, which is then amplified, creating a ringing noise. Adaptive feedback cancellation cancels the noise with an adaptive filter. The product of the adaptive filter cancels the feedback from the microphone, creating clear sound from the hearing aid.

=== Echo Cancellation ===
Echo cancellation is a form of adaptive feedback cancellation used in telephones and teleconferencing devices. Much like adaptive feedback cancellation in hearing aids, echo cancellation uses an adaptive filter to cancel echo reverberations from a microphone.

=== Jammer Suppression ===
Jammer suppression is a way to reject interference with large signals that are much stronger than traditional signals. This process uses an adaptive filter, and its algorithm has applications in all types of signal suppression.

== Current Research ==
=== Prediction Error Method ===
The prediction error method is an adaptive feedback cancellation algorithm that focuses on using audio signals instead of speech signals. This change proposes to improve adaptive feedback cancellation in devices like hearing aids and other audio applications. This approach works closely with echo cancellation and looks to bring the techniques in echo cancellation to hearing aids.

=== Sub-band Feedback Cancellation ===
Sub-band feedback cancellation is a type of adaptive feedback cancellation that relies less on computations and algorithms, but rather uses the signals already in the device to optimize the feedback cancellation. Sub-band feedback cancellation's purpose is to make adaptive feedback cancellation cheaper and more widespread.

=== Digital signal processing ===
Digital signal processing aims to reduce the effect of adaptive feedback cancellation on sound quality with the use of feedback tests. The method also reports more gain in the hearing aid, and cites a figure of 10 decibels.

=== Adaptive Feedback Cancellation in Smartphones ===
Research from 2018 is ongoing into adaptive feedback cancellation on smartphone speakers and microphones. Current research intends to use digital signal processing to mimic the cancellation in hearing aids in smartphones.
