= Gain before feedback =

How much a microphone can be amplified before causing audio feedback

In live sound mixing, gain before feedback (GBF) is a practical measure of how much a microphone can be amplified in a sound reinforcement system before causing audio feedback. In audiology, GBF is a measure of hearing aid performance. In both fields the amount of gain is measured in decibels at or just below the point at which the sound from the speaker driver re-enters the microphone and the system begins to ring or feed back. Potential acoustic gain (PAG) is a calculated figure representing gain that a system can support without feeding back.

== Live sound ==
In live sound mixing, GBF is dependent on a wide variety of conditions: the pickup pattern (polar pattern) of the microphone, the frequency response of the microphone and of the rest of the sound system, the number of active microphones and loudspeakers, the acoustic conditions of the environment including reverberation and echo, and the relative positions of the microphones, the loudspeakers, the sound sources and the audience. Each doubling of the number of open microphones (NOM) reduces the PAG by 3 dB.

Directional microphones are used in live sound to maximize GBF. Directional microphones with cardioid and hypercardioid pickup patterns are designed with reduced sensitivity to the rear (cardioid) or to an angle between the side and the rear (hypercardioid). Such microphones are aimed such that their pickup pattern is weakest in the direction of the loudspeakers. This is especially useful in the presence of foldback monitors (stage wedges). Directional loudspeaker systems may also be used to increase GBF.

The distance from the sound source to the microphone is a critical element of GBF. Greater GBF is obtained with the performer closer to the microphone; an instance of the inverse-square law. If the performer reduces the distance to the microphone by half, the PAG is increased by 6 dB while the environmental sounds remain relatively the same.

The sound system operator can use equalization to change the frequency response of a microphone or loudspeakers system to increase GBF. The frequency which first begins ringing or feeding back is identified by the operator, and a notch or parametric filter is engaged to reduce the overall level of that frequency. This process is repeated several times to identify and reduce the level of further feedback frequencies. A graphic equalizer can be used for the same purpose but with somewhat less precision. Automatic feedback suppressors automate and speed the process of identifying and reducing feedback frequencies. A small amount of pitch shift applied to the signal can increase GBF, as can the addition of a few milliseconds of straight delay. The latter will increase the number of feedback frequencies while reducing the frequency range within which they occur, but it will slow the rate at which feedback grows. In practice, adding straight delay to a signal improves GBF.

== Hearing aid ==
A hearing aid incorporates a miniature microphone and a very small speaker driver, and various conditions may increase or decrease the amount of gain that can be applied to the microphone signal before feedback. A well-fitted hearing aid has more GBF than one that is loose. The shape of the earmold is a factor, with larger and heavier designs capable of delivering greater GBF. Hearing aid designs deliver gain in increasing steps depending on the severity of the patient's hearing loss; the range spans from 10 to 65 dB of gain. To prevent feedback with the highest amounts of gain, such designs require the tightest-fitting earmolds with no venting, and the deepest penetration of the ear canal to place the speaker driver as close as practical to the eardrum.

== See also ==
- Control Theory § Stability
