= OCL amplifier =

Audio amplifier with direct-coupled capacitorless output

An OCL amplifier (output capacitor-less amplifier) is any audio amplifier with direct-coupled capacitorless output. Typically, OCL amplifiers can be any of several amplifier classes, and typically have a push–pull output stage.

Advantages of OCL amplifiers over capacitor-coupled amplifiers include

- Avoiding the cost and bulk of an output capacitor
- Better immunity to motorboat oscillation
- Greater output power at very low frequencies and DC

Disadvantages of OCL amplifiers include

- Larger power dissipation and passing DC through the load, in the minority of designs with poorly controlled DC bias point
- Increased sensitivity of the output DC bias point to process variations, although the last disadvantage is less important for older bipolar processes.

== Implementations ==
- LM4910 by National Semiconductor
- Lab tutorial on OCL amplifier from Hong Kong Polytechnic University
