= Earmold =

Fitted aural device for sound conduction

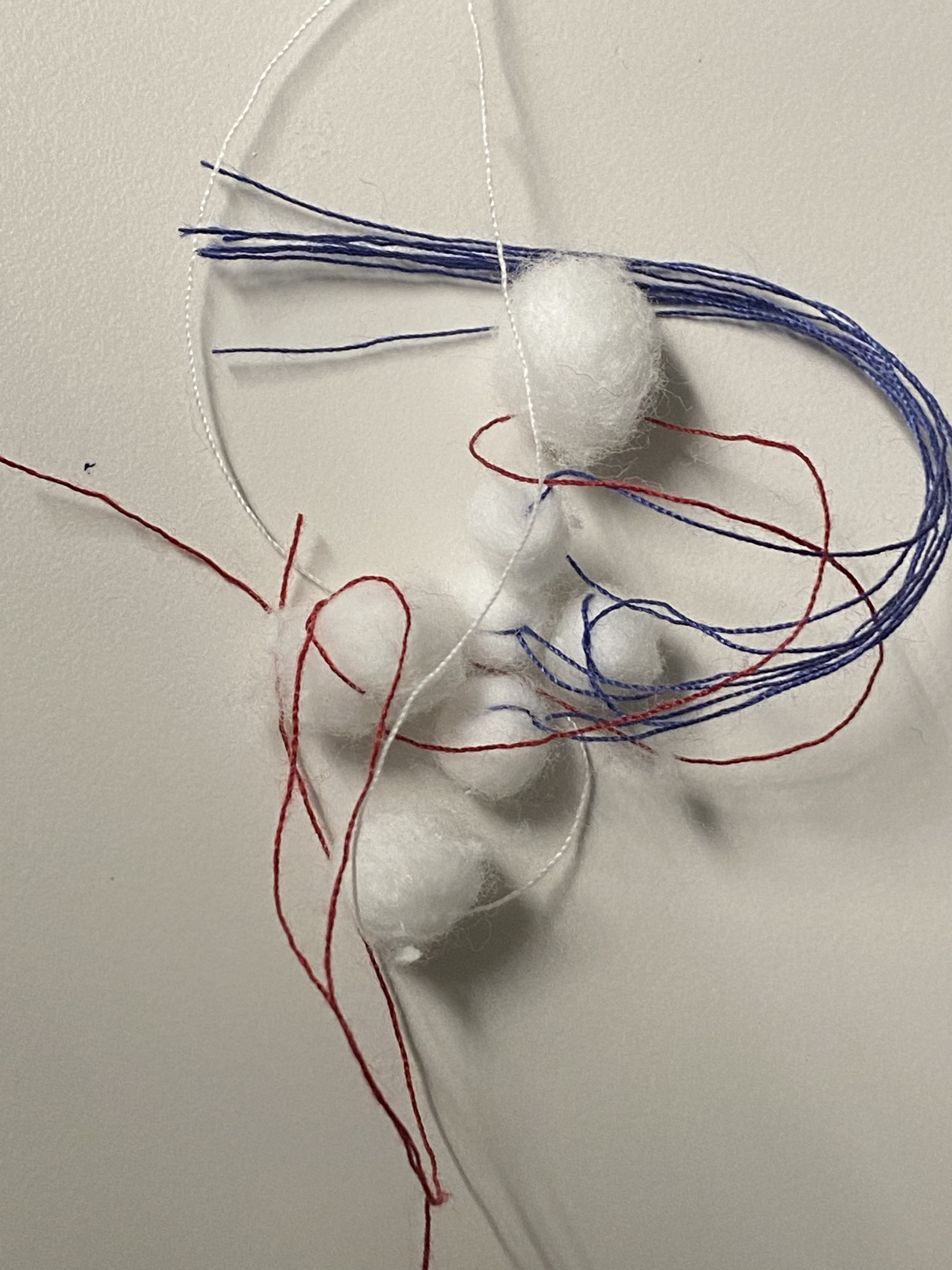
Cotton oto-blockers that are used to prevent the impression material from hitting the tympanic membrane

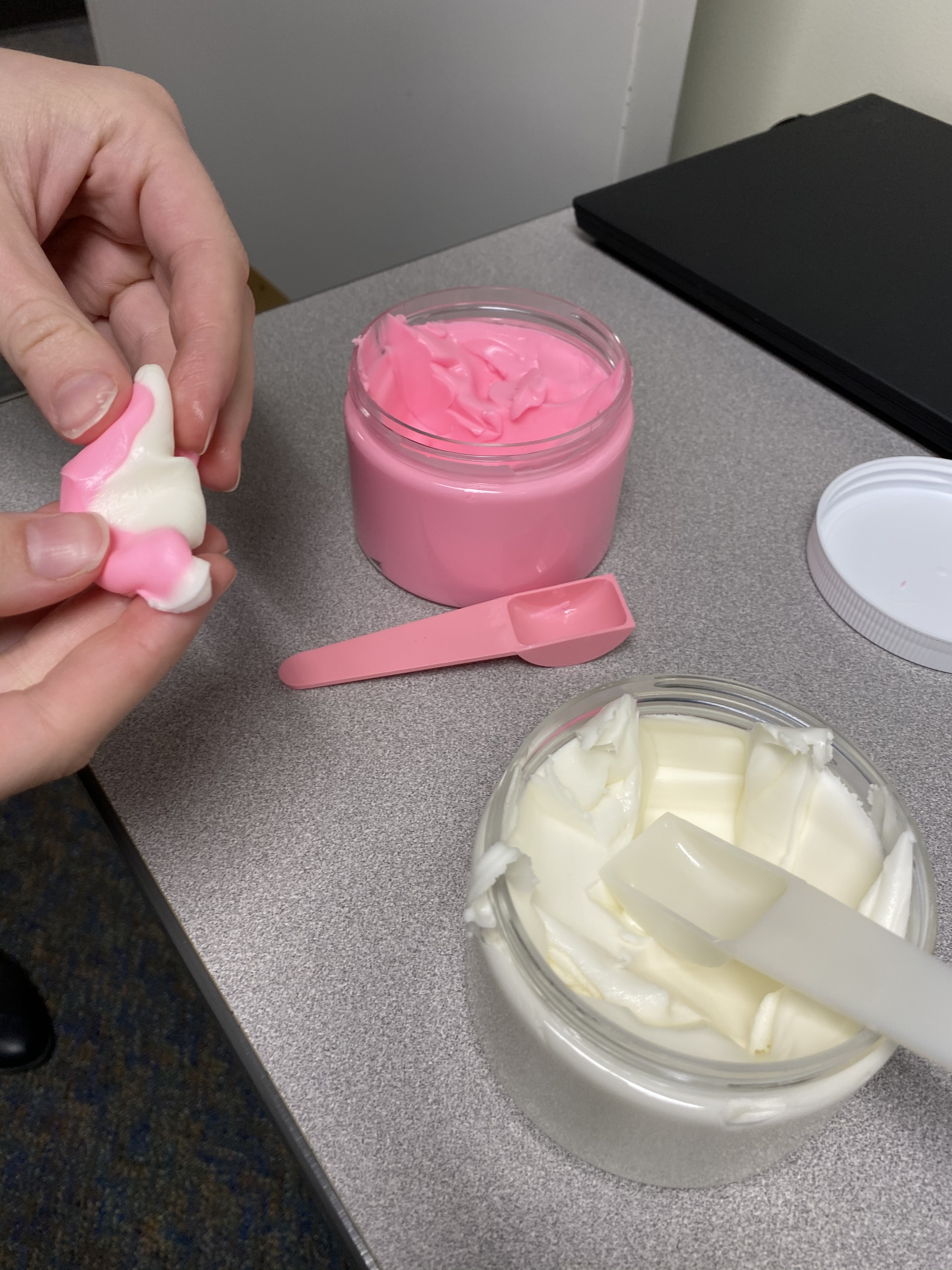
Impression material being mixed together. This is the start of the mixing process, as the material needs to be one color.

An earmold (also spelled; ear mold, ear mould or earmould) is a device worn inserted into the ear for sound conduction or hearing protection. Earmolds are anatomically shaped and can be produced in different sizes for general use or specially cast from particular ear forms. Some users specify how hard or soft they want their mold to be, an audiologist can also suggest this. As a conductor, it improves sound transmission to eardrums. This is an essential feature to diminish feedback paths in hearing aids and assure better intelligibility in noisy-environment communication. The main goal in wearing earmolds is to attain better user comfort and efficiency. Earmolds (and their tubes) often turn yellow and stiff with age, and thus need replacement on a regular basis. Traditionally, the job of making earmolds is very time-consuming and skillful; each one is made individually in a molding process. However, new digital ear laser scanners can accelerate this process.

== Viscosity ==
The texture of the earmold can have low, medium, or high viscosity. The lower type of viscosity will be soft while the higher viscosity is firm. It is thought that a higher viscosity will lead to a better impression of the ear canal while the lower viscosity may not fill in the ear canal as well. The type of viscosity to use is dependent on the person using the material and the type of viscosity they are most comfortable with.

== Syringe or pistol ==
Once the viscosity is chosen the person can then choose to use a pistol or syringe for pushing the ear impression material in the ear. The syringes need the material mixed together until it is a singular color and then it can be pushed through the tube of the syringe. The plunger of the syringe will then be used to push the material into the smaller area. The pistol uses pre-measured impression material and requires the person to press the trigger lever for the impression material to come out. Before the impression material is set in the external auditory canal, otoscopy needs to be performed to make sure the canal is free of cerumen or any other foreign objects. With the impression material ready to use the clinician will want to put an oto-blocker into the ear canal. This will help prevent material from reaching the tympanic membrane of the middle ear. For the oto-blocker to be put in appropriately the clinician will want to pull up on the top of the pinna so the oto-blocker can be put past the second bend of the ear canal. With the oto-blocker in place the impression material can now be used to fill in the external ear canal and the spaces and crevices of the outer ear.

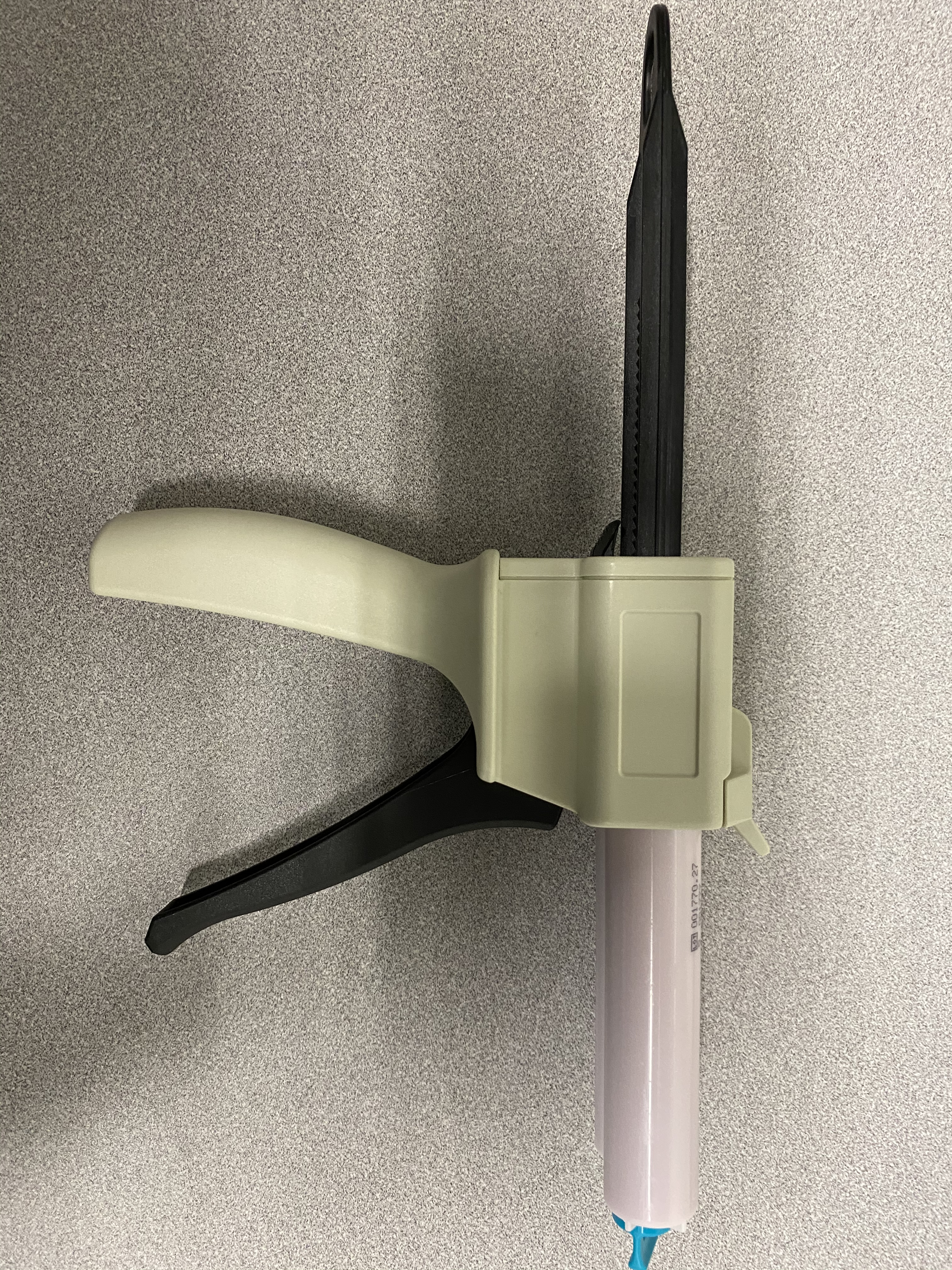
Gun/pistol for earmolds

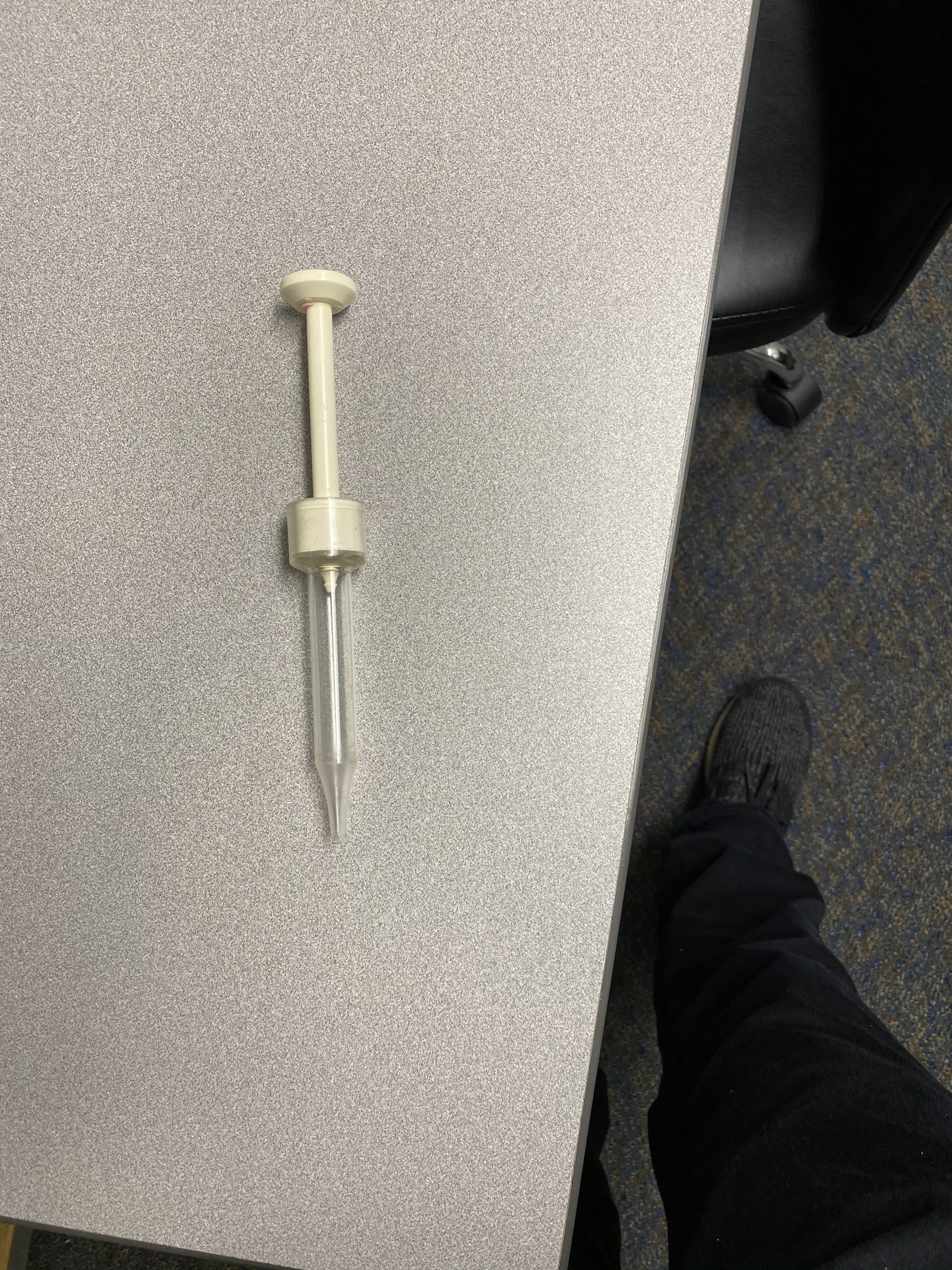
Syringe that can be used for earmolds

== Earmold material ==
With the impression material in place and set in the ear canal the clinician can decide what type of earmold material would benefit the patient the most. The three types of earmold materials include: acrylic, polyvinyl chloride, and silicone. Each type of material has positives and negatives about them, for instance, acrylic can help older patients with dexterity issues as the earmold is hard so insertion and removal of the earmold is easier or a silicone earmold which is soft and is extremely useful for children because of how pliable the material is.

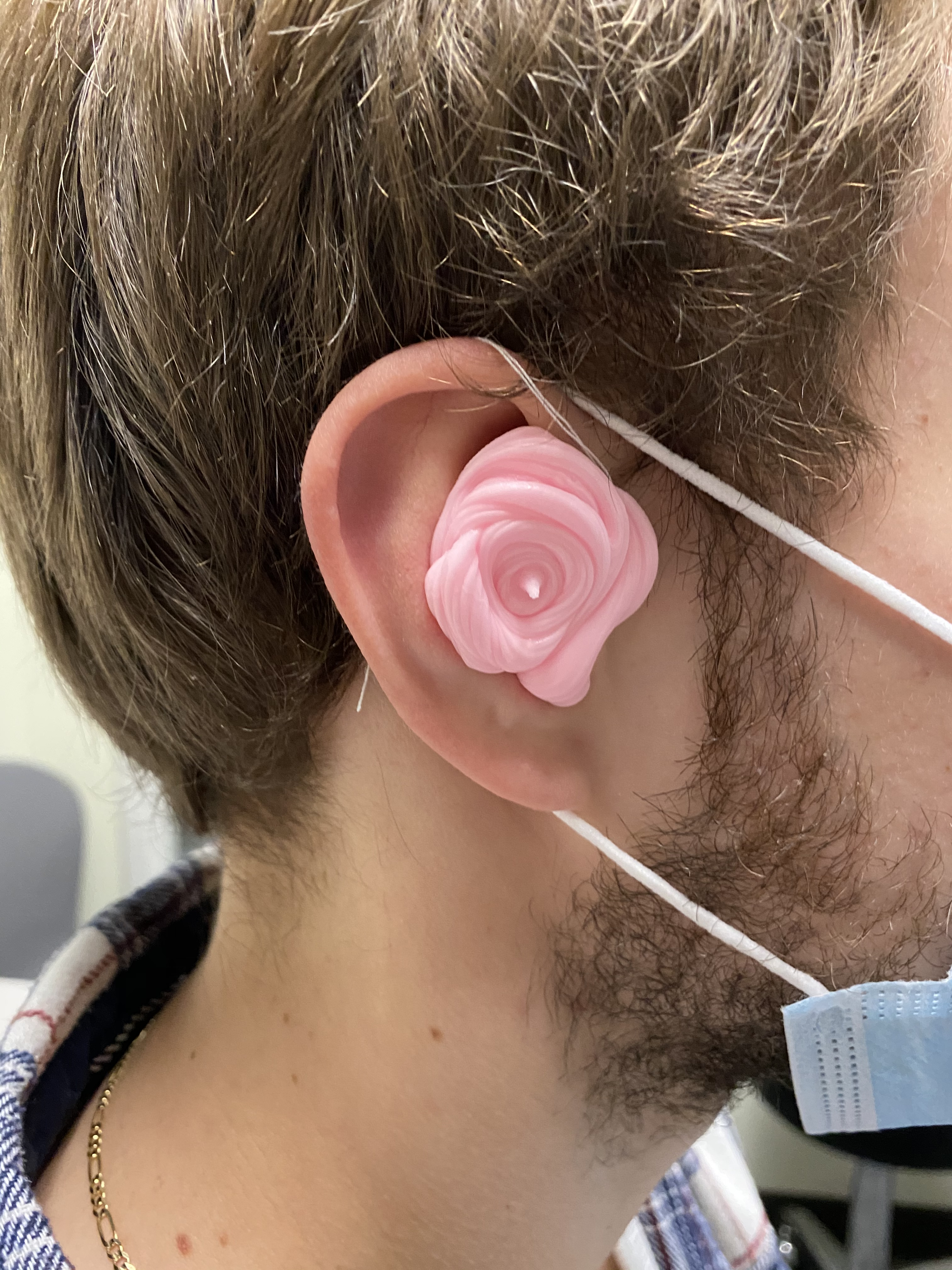
Impression material hardening in the external ear canal

== Ear scanning ==
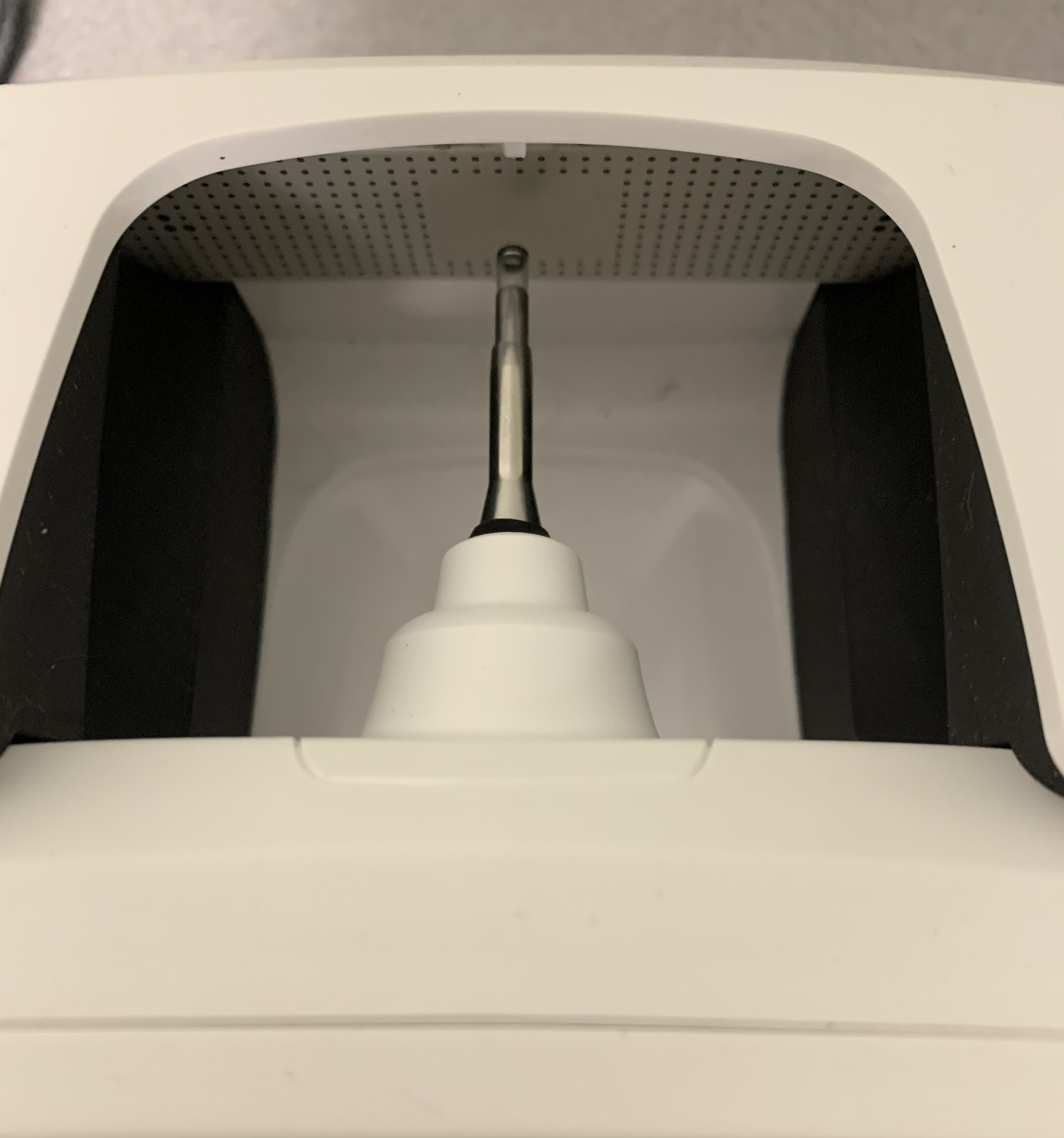
The external ear canal probe on an ear scanner

Earmolds present a variety of challenges. They can be inconsistent, time-consuming, or inaccurate. This is why, in the early 2000s, a new idea for determining the anatomical shape of the individual's ear canal began circulating. The Navy often had issues with earmolds, for the fact that once the initial impression was taken, the impressions would have to be shipped to a manufacturer before the hearing protection could be made. This made imperative personal protective equipment often time-consuming and difficult to obtain. This is why the Navy then began looking for universities to create an anatomical 3D model of the ear using a scanner. The idea was that these scans could be sent electronically to manufacturers almost instantaneously. Karol Hatzilias from Georgia Tech undertook inventing an ear scanner, which has since then been successfully integrated onto Naval ships. This technology has slowly been working its way into clinical settings. Many different companies have come up with their own version of ear scanning.
