= Feedback suppressor =

Audio signal processing device which prevents or suppress audio feedback

A feedback suppressor is an audio signal processing device which is used in the signal path in a live sound reinforcement system to prevent or suppress audio feedback.

Digital feedback reduction is the application of digital techniques to sound reinforcement in order to reduce audio feedback and increase headroom.

== Operation ==
Feedback suppressors use three main methods to control feedback,

- frequency shifting,
- adaptive filtering and
- automatic notch filtering

Frequency shifting is the oldest feedback suppression technique dating back to the 1960s. This technique works by introducing a varying shift in frequency to the system response. This is typically implemented using a frequency mixer. Only modest improvement of gain before feedback is achieved and the technique creates noticeable pitch distortion in music program.

The adaptive filter approach works by modeling the transfer function of the sound reinforcement system and subtracts the reinforced sound from the inputs to the system in the same way that an echo canceller removes echoes from a communications system.

Parametric equalization and notch filters are commonly used by sound engineers to manually control feedback. A feedback suppressor using the automatic notch technique listens for the onset of feedback and automatically inserts a notch filter into the signal path at the frequency of the detected feedback. Feedback suppressors use several techniques for detecting feedback from non-invasive harmonic analysis of a potential feedback signal to more invasive adaptive filtering and speculative placement of notch filters. The automatic notch technique is the most popular method and has the advantage that the sound is not colored until the system is at risk of feedback.
