= Ashly Audio =

American audio equipment manufacturer

Ashly Audio, Inc.
- Company type: Private
- Industry: Professional audio
- Genre: Audio equipment
- Founded: 1974; 52 years ago United States
- Founders: Bill Thompson; Dave Malloy
- Headquarters: Webster, New York, U.S.
- Area served: Worldwide
- Products: Audio equipment
- Parent: Exertis JAM
- Website: ashly.com

Ashly Audio, Inc. is an American audio equipment company founded in Upstate New York by Bill Thompson and Dave Malloy in 1974. Ashly produces over 40 products, including amplifiers, mixers, equalizers, digital and analog audio processors, for the recording and live sound industries. Ashly Audio is a division of Canadian corporate group Exertis | JAM.

== History ==
=== 1960-1976 ===
Ashly Audio, Inc. was started as a live sound reinforcement company until the founders began producing their own equipment. The company was named after a founder, Larry Ashley, who did not continue with the company into their era of equipment production when they became a corporation in 1974.

Demand for the components used in Ashly's mixers caused the company to develop their equipment in a modular fashion. Their first successful product came in 1976, when they developed the SC-66 stereo parametric equalizer. It was a hit and Ashly changed their focus as a company toward developing modular rack gear.

=== 1977-present ===
Ashly developed power amplifiers using MOS-FET technology. Their amplifiers were the first to be approved by Lucasfilm for THX certified movie theater sound systems. Later developments included the Ashly Protea and multichannel power amplifiers.

In 2008, Ashly Audio was sold to the Canadian audio distribution company JAM Industries, which rebranded as Exertis | JAM in 2021.
