= Songlorious =

- Developer: Omayya Atout and Ellen Hodges
- Type: Music store
- Launch date: June 2020
- Status: Active
- Pricing model: Per song basis
- Website: https://www.songlorious.com/

Songlorious is an online music company that creates custom songs. It is owned and operated by musician co-founders Omayya Atout and Ellen Hodges based in Chattanooga, Tennessee.

== History and overview ==
Songlorious was launched in June 2020. Atout, was a civil engineer and his wife, Ellen Hodges was a barista. Just before the COVID-19 pandemic, the couple was asked to create a song for a friend’s wedding which became a hit. During the pandemic, the duo quit their jobs and started Songlorious. They received more than a hundred orders in the initial weeks of the site launch. They expanded and have approximately 120 independent artists on their roster, as of March 2021. Songlorious allows artists to maintain the rights to the songs they create.

The process of song creation involves the user picking details such as genre, mood and length of the song. The musicians then collaborate to create a personalized song based on the preferences, and deliver the song to the user.
