= Transmission line loudspeaker =

Loudspeaker enclosure design

A transmission line loudspeaker is a loudspeaker enclosure design that uses the topology of an acoustic transmission line within the cabinet, compared to the simpler enclosures used by sealed (closed) or ported (bass reflex) designs. Instead of reverberating in a fairly simple damped enclosure, sound from the back of the bass speaker is directed into a long (generally folded) damped pathway within the speaker enclosure, which allows far greater control and use of speaker energy and the resulting sound.

Inside a transmission line (TL) loudspeaker is a (usually folded) pathway into which the sound is directed. The pathway is often covered with varying types and depths of absorbent material, and it may vary in size or taper, and may be open or closed at its far end. The aim of such a design is to try and ensure that undesired resonances and energies are selectively absorbed or reduced ("damped") due to the effects of the duct, or alternatively only emerge from the open end in phase with the sound radiated from the front of the driver, enhancing the output level ("sensitivity") at low frequencies. The transmission line acts as an acoustic waveguide, and the internal filling material both reduces reflection and resonance, and also results in a reduction in the speed of sound within the duct, which serves to lower the tuning frequency.

Transmission line loudspeaker designs are more complex to implement, making mass production difficult, but their advantages have led to commercial success for a number of manufacturers such as IMF Electronics, TDL Electronics, and PMC. As a rule, transmission line speakers tend to have exceptionally high-fidelity low-frequency response far below that of a typical speaker or subwoofer, reaching into the infrasonic range (British company TDL's studio monitor range from the 1990s quoted their frequency responses as starting from as low as 17 Hz depending upon model with a sensitivity of 87 dB for 1 W @ 1 meter), without the need for a separate enclosure or driver. Acoustically, TL speakers roll off more slowly (less steeply) at low frequencies, and they are thought to provide better driver control than standard vented-box cabinet designs, are less sensitive to positioning, and tend to create a very spacious soundstage. Modern TL speakers were described in a 2000 review as "match[ing] reflex cabinet designs in every respect, but with an extra octave of bass, lower LF distortion and a frequency balance which is more independent of listening level".

Although more complex to design and tune, and not as easy to analyze and calculate as other designs, the transmission line design is valued by several smaller manufacturers, as it avoids many of the major disadvantages of other loudspeaker designs. In particular, the basic parameters and equations describing sealed and reflex designs are fairly well understood; the range of options involved in a transmission line design means that the general design can be somewhat calculated but final transmission line tuning requires considerable attention and is less easy to automate.

== Purpose and design overview ==
Low frequencies, which remain in phase, emerge from the vent which essentially acts as a second driver. The advantage of this approach is that the air pressure loading the main driver is maintained which controls the driver over a wide frequency range and reduces distortion. [The TL design] also produces higher SPL [sensitivity or loudness] and lower bass extension than ported or sealed box of similar size.

— PMC, TL speaker design company

I have an intuitive abhorrence of resonance enhancement to give a loudspeaker more "kick" or apparent bass as they can sound "single-noted". Yes you can pick out the bass rhythm but what about the melody. What a transmission line gives in my experience is a much smoother and more realistic bass quality.

— Steve Davey, former TNT Audio staff member/reviewer

A transmission line is used in loudspeaker design to reduce time, phase, and resonance-related distortions, and in many designs to gain exceptional bass extension to the lower end of human hearing, and in some cases the near-infrasonic (below 20 Hz). TDL's 1980s reference speaker range (now discontinued) contained models with frequency ranges of 20 Hz upwards, down to 17 Hz upwards, without needing a separate subwoofer. Irving M. Fried, an advocate of TL design, stated that:

"I believe that speakers should preserve the integrity of the signal waveform and the Audio Perfectionist Journal has presented a great deal of information about the importance of time domain performance in loudspeakers. I’m not the only one who appreciates time- and phase-accurate speakers but I have been virtually the only advocate to speak out in print in recent years. There’s a reason for that."

"It is difficult and costly to design and manufacture a time- and phase-accurate speaker system. Few of today’s high-end loudspeakers are time- and phase-accurate designs. The audio magazines need to appeal to a broad spectrum of advertisers including many who make speaker systems which are time incoherent. The magazines, and the reviewers who write for them, have ignored or downplayed the issue of time- and phase-accuracy in order to maximize advertising revenue. I am not alone in recognizing this situation."

Some proponents of TL loudspeakers consider that using a TL is the theoretical ideal manner in which to load a moving-coil drive unit. However, it is also one of the more complex types of constructions. The most common and practical implementation is to fit a drive unit to the end of a long duct that is usually open at the far end. In practice, the duct is folded inside a conventional-shaped cabinet, so that the open end of the duct appears as a vent on the speaker cabinet. There are many ways in which the duct can be folded, and the line is often tapered in cross section to avoid parallel internal surfaces that encourage standing waves. Some speaker designs also use a spiral or elliptical spiral-shaped duct, usually with one speaker element in the front or two speaker elements arranged one on each side of the cabinet. Depending upon the drive unit, and quantity and various physical properties of absorbent material, the amount of taper will be adjusted during the design process to tune the duct to remove irregularities in its response. The internal partitioning provides substantial bracing for the entire structure, reducing cabinet flexing and colouration. The inside faces of the duct or line are treated with an absorbent material to provide the correct termination with frequency to load the drive unit as a TL. The enclosure behaves like an infinite baffle, potentially absorbing most or all of the speaker unit's rear energies. A theoretically perfect TL would absorb all frequencies entering the line from the rear of the drive unit but remains theoretical, as it would have to be infinitely long. The physical constraints of the real world, demand that the length of the line must often be less than 4 meters before the cabinet becomes too large for any practical applications, so not all the rear energy can be absorbed by the line. In a realized TL, only the upper bass is TL loaded in the true sense of the term (i.e., fully absorbed); the low bass is allowed to freely radiate from the vent in the cabinet. The line therefore effectively works as a low-pass filter, another crossover point in fact, achieved acoustically by the line and its absorbent filling. Below this “crossover point” the low bass is loaded by the column of air formed by the length of the line. The length of the line is specified so as to reverse the phase of the rear output of the drive unit as it exits the vent. This acoustic energy combines with the output of the bass unit, extending its response and effectively creating a second driver.

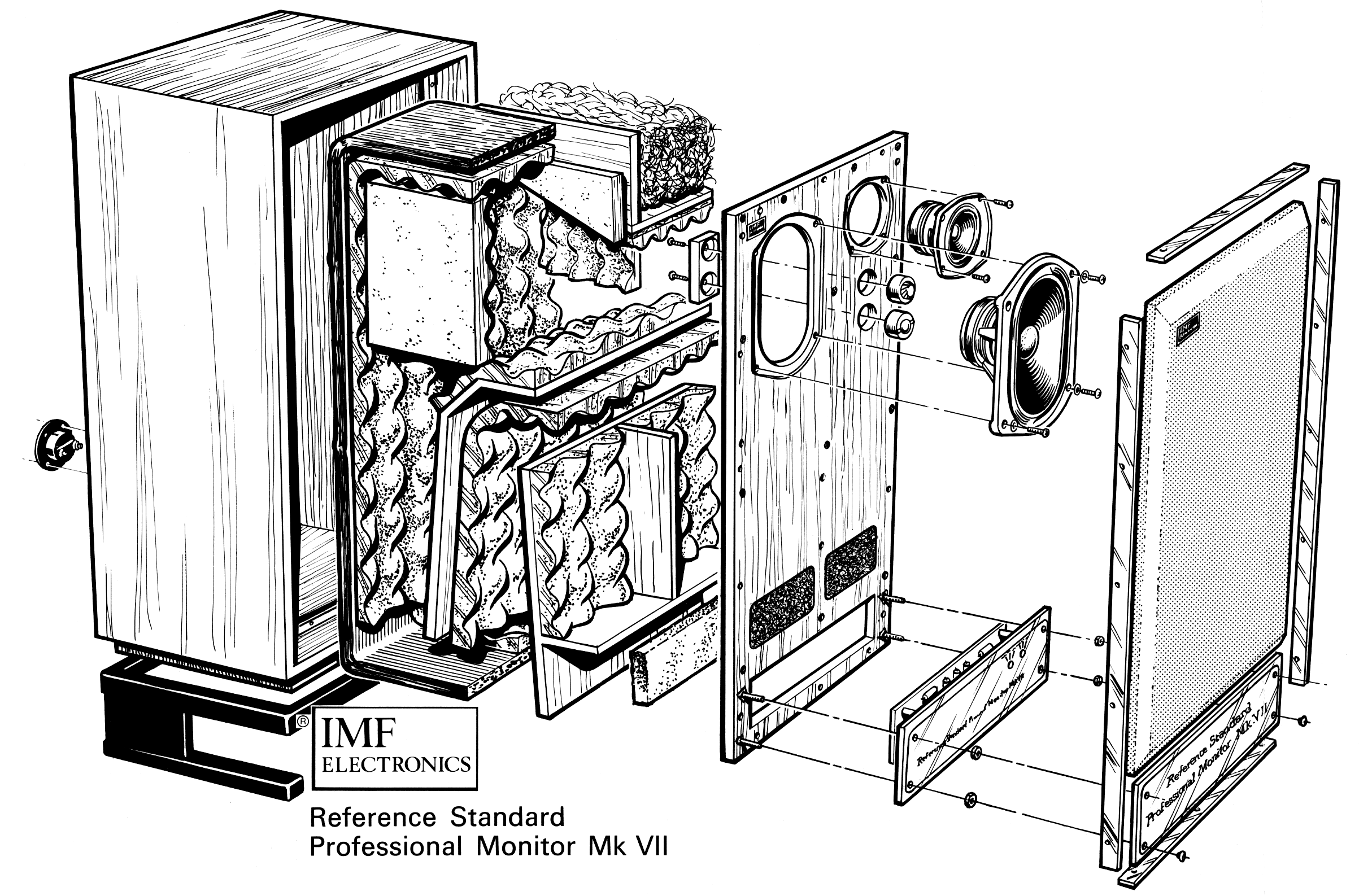
Cutaway drawing of a commercial 4-way transmission line loudspeaker system, the IMF Reference Standard Professional Monitor Mk VII (circa 1982). The enclosure is 104 cm (41 in) high (116 cm (46 in) on its stand), 43 cm (17 in) deep and 50 cm (20 in) wide, with a gross enclosure volume of about 218 liters. The efficiency using pink noise at 1 meter is 80–82 dB at 1 watt, depending upon the filter/equalisation settings. Frequency response was quoted to be 17 Hz to 40 kHz, with crossover frequencies of 350 Hz, 3 kHz and 13 kHz. The drive units consisted of a 30 by 21 cm (11.8 by 8.3 in) styrene/fibreglass woofer, 13 cm (5.1 in) engineered polymer midrange, 4.5 cm (1.8 in) ferro-fluid damped tweeter, and 2 cm (0.79 in) ferro-fluid damped chemical-dome high-frequency tweeter.

Essentially, the goal of the transmission line is to minimize acoustical or mechanical impedance at frequencies corresponding to the fundamental free-air resonance of the bass driver. This simultaneously reduces stored energy in the driver's motion, reduces distortion, and critically damps the driver by maximizing acoustic output (maximal acoustical loading or coupling) at the terminus. This also minimizes the negative effects of acoustic energy that would otherwise (as with a sealed enclosure) be reflected back to the driver in a sealed cavity.

Transmission line loudspeakers employ this tube-like resonant cavity, with the length set between 1/6 and 1/2 the wavelength of the fundamental resonant frequency of the loudspeaker driver being used. The cross-sectional area of the tube is typically comparable to the cross-sectional area of the driver's radiating surface. This cross section is typically tapered down to approximately 1/4 of the starting area at the terminus or open end of the line. While not all lines use a taper, the standard classical transmission line employs a taper from 1/3 to 1/4 area (ratio of terminus area to starting area directly behind the driver). This taper serves to dampen the buildup of standing waves within the line, which can create sharp nulls in response at the terminus output at even multiples of the driver's resonance frequency Fs.

In a transmission line speaker, the transmission line itself can be open ("vented") or closed at the far end. Closed designs typically have negligible acoustic output from the enclosure except from the driver, while open-ended designs exploit the low-pass filter effect of the line, and the resultant low bass energy emerges to reinforce the output from the driver at low frequencies. Transmission line enclosures may have smoother impedance curves than other loudspeakers, possibly from a lack of frequency-specific resonances, but can also have relatively low efficiency.

One key advantage of transmission lines is their ability to conduct the back wave behind the transducer more effectively away from it – reducing the chance for reflected energy permeating back through the diaphragm out of phase with the primary signal. Not all transmission line designs do this effectively. Most offset transmission line speakers place a reflective wall fairly close behind the transducer within the enclosure – posing a problem for internal reflections emanating back through the transducer diaphragm. Older descriptions explained the design in terms of "impedance mismatch", or pressure waves "reflected" back into the enclosure; these descriptions are now considered outdated and inaccurate as technically the transmission line works through selective production of standing waves and constructive and destructive interference (see below).

A second benefit is that the resulting music is time coherent (i.e., in phase). Fried quoted in 2002, a listening test performed and reported in December 2000's Hi-Fi News (as he believed) in which a high-quality recording was obtained using reputable but non-time-coherent loudspeakers and this recording was then time phase corrected; an expert listening panel "voted unanimously for the superior realism and accuracy of the time corrected output" for high-quality sound reproduction.

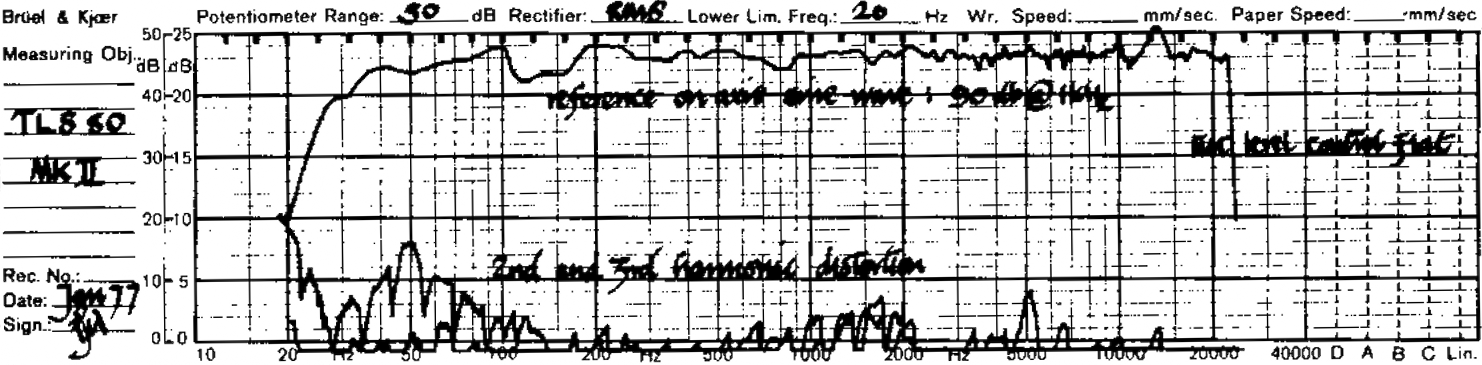
Swept-sine on-axis frequency response curve for the IMF TLS80 MkII transmission line loudspeaker system (circa 1977). Note the cancellation-induced dip in the response in the 100–200 Hz frequency region.

One of the significant and common problems with a transmission line loudspeaker system is the unwanted phase-cancellation effects of higher line harmonics bleeding from the transmission line and adversely affecting the overall sound field. For example, in the PMC PMC6 mid-sized transmission line monitoring loudspeaker, there is a dip around 300 Hz that is caused by the fifth harmonic of the transmission line’s resonant frequency. This type of problem is quite common, and it was readily apparent in other transmission line loudspeakers. For example, the large IMF TLS80 MkII from 1977 also had an anomaly, but this time at the lower frequency of about 140 Hz, consisting of an almost one-octave-wide deleterious 3-dB or so dip in the on-axis response. Another problem is that the sound radiation from the exit of the line is spread over a quite broad frequency range caused by the hump of the quarter-wave transmission line resonance, whereas the high-Q port resonance of a vented-box loudspeaker rolls off much more quickly and extends over a much narrower frequency band. These sorts of issues with transmission line loudspeakers can lead to tonal accuracy problems that cannot be resolved.

A transmission line speaker employs, essentially, two distinct forms of bass loading, which historically and confusingly have been amalgamated in the TL description. Separating the upper and lower bass analysis reveals why such designs have so many potential advantages and disadvantages over reflex and infinite baffle designs. Measurements indicate that the upper bass is only partially absorbed by the line, making a clean and neutral response somewhat difficult if not impossible to achieve. The lower bass is extended and distortion is lowered by the line's control over the drive unit's excursion. One of the exclusive benefits of a TL design is its ability to produce very low frequencies even at low monitoring levels – TL speakers can routinely produce full-range sound usually requiring a subwoofer, and do so to very high levels of low-frequency accuracy. The main disadvantage of the design is that it is more labor-intensive to create and tune a high-quality and consistent transmission line, compared to building a simple vented-box or closed-box enclosure. One PMC employee was quoted as saying that optimising a transmission line loudspeaker is "like juggling water". A 2010 Hifi Avenue TL speaker review commented that "One thing I have noticed about transmission line designs is that they create a rather big soundstage and seem to handle crescendoes with ease".

== History of transmission line loudspeakers ==
=== Invention and early use ===
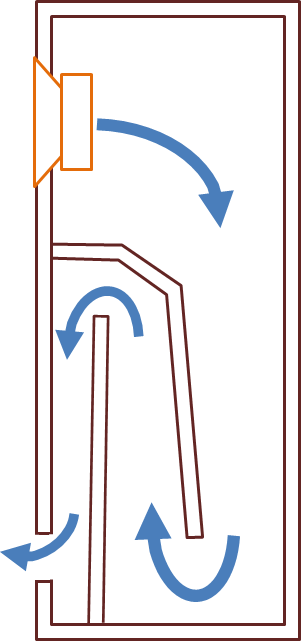
This image is actually an inverted folded horn. It is distinguished from a true transmission line enclosure, which has the same vent width throughout, by having a throat that is wider than its port opening.

The concept was innovated within acoustic enclosure design, and originally termed an "acoustical labyrinth", by acoustic engineer and later Director of Research, Benjamin Olney, who developed the concept at the Stromberg-Carlson Telephone Co. in the early 1930s while studying the effect of enclosure shape and size on speaker output, including the effect of "extreme length in a box baffle". A patent was filed in 1934. The design was used in their console radios beginning in 1936. A loudspeaker enclosure based on the concept was proposed in October 1965 by Dr A.R. Bailey in Wireless World magazine, referencing a production version of an acoustic-line enclosure design from Radford Electronics Ltd. The article postulated that energy from the rear of a driver unit could be essentially absorbed, without damping the cone's motion or superimposing internal reflections and resonance, so Bailey and Radford reasoned that the rear wave could be channelled down a long pipe. If the acoustic energy was absorbed, it would not be available to excite resonances. A pipe of sufficient length could be tapered and stuffed so that the energy loss was almost complete, minimizing output from the open end. No broad consensus on the ideal taper (expanding, uniform cross-section, or contracting) has been established.

=== "Classic" era transmission line loudspeakers ===
Source for much of this section: Loudspeakers: for music recording and reproduction (Newell & Holland, 2007)

The birth of the modern transmission line speaker design came about in 1965 with the publication of A.R. Bailey's article in Wireless World, “A Non-resonant Loudspeaker Enclosure Design”, detailing a working Transmission Line. Bailey followed up his first article with a second one in 1972. Radford Electronics Ltd took up this innovative design and briefly manufactured the first commercial Transmission Line loudspeaker. Although acknowledged as the father of the Transmission Line, Bailey's work drew on the work on labyrinth design, dating back as early as the 1930s. His design, however, differed significantly in the way in which he filled the cabinet with absorbent materials. Bailey hit upon the idea of absorbing all the energy generated by the bass unit inside the cabinet, providing an inert platform for the drive unit to work from; unchecked, this energy produces spurious resonances in the cabinet and its structure, adding distortion to the original signal.

Shortly thereafter, the design entered mainstream Hi-Fi, through the works of Irving M. "Bud" Fried in the United States, and a British trio: John Hayes, John Wright, and David Brown. Dave D'Lugos describes the period that followed (approximately 35 years until the start of the 21st Century) as a period when the "classical designs" were created.

Fried was exposed during his time at Harvard University to high-fidelity audio reproduction, and later became an importer of audiophile items. Under the trademark "IMF" (his initials), from 1961, he eventually became involved with many advancements in audiophile equipment: cartridges (IMF – London, IMF – Goldring), tonearms (SME, Gould, Audio and Design), amplifiers (Quad, Custom Series), loudspeakers (Lowther, Quad, Celestion, Bowers and Wilkins, Barker, etc.). In 1968 he met John Hayes and John Wright, who had already designed an award-winning tonearm in the UK and had brought along a transmission line speaker designed by John Wright — described by Hayes as "fanatical regarding quality" — in order to promote and demonstrate the tonearm at a New York hifi show. Fried unexpectedly received a number of orders for the unnamed speaker, which he dubbed the "IMF". The British pair, along with Hayes' colleague David Brown, agreed to form a UK company to design and manufacture speakers which would be sold by Fried in the United States. John Hayes later wrote that:

Of course, Bud, had called it the IMF, and therefore, perhaps mistakenly we registered IMF and formed an IMF company... At no time did Bud Fried have any input on the designs. We sold him speakers and he was the US Distributor... [...] Bud Fried was never a Director or shareholder of IMF Electronics. IMF electronics were the only company manufacturing the transmission line speakers. The name IMF was adopted because Bud Fried had demonstrated the first prototype speakers at the New York hi fi show, and because of the publicity and the fact that he had used his name on the then unnamed speakers, we stuck with the name which was a mistake on our part. It was never his company. After our lawsuit he called his speakers Fried.

The relationship broke down acrimoniously when Fried began to make his own, poorer quality speakers, also marketed as "IMF", and refused to cease until a court agreed that the UK business had the right to the trademark IMF for loudspeakers. Following the split, Fried in the USA (under the brandname "Fried") and the three founders of IMF Electronics in the UK (via a joint venture with driver manufacturer Elac under the name TDL), both became well known in audiophile circles for many years as major advocates of transmission line speaker design. TDL closed after John Wright's gradual failing health and death in 1999 from cancer. He was described in his 1999 obituary as "one of the most important figures on the British hi-fi scene since the mid-1960s... best remembered for his transmission-line loudspeaker designs". The brand was acquired by Audio Partnerships (part of retailer group Richer Sounds). Fried died six years later, in 2005.

=== 21st century ===
In the early 21st century, mathematical models that seemed to approximate the behavior of real-world TL speakers and cabinets began to emerge. According to the website t-linespeakers.org, this led to an understanding that what he termed the "classical" speakers, designed largely by "trial and error", were a "good job" and the best that was reasonably possible at that time, but that better designs were now achievable based on modeled responses.

== Design principles ==
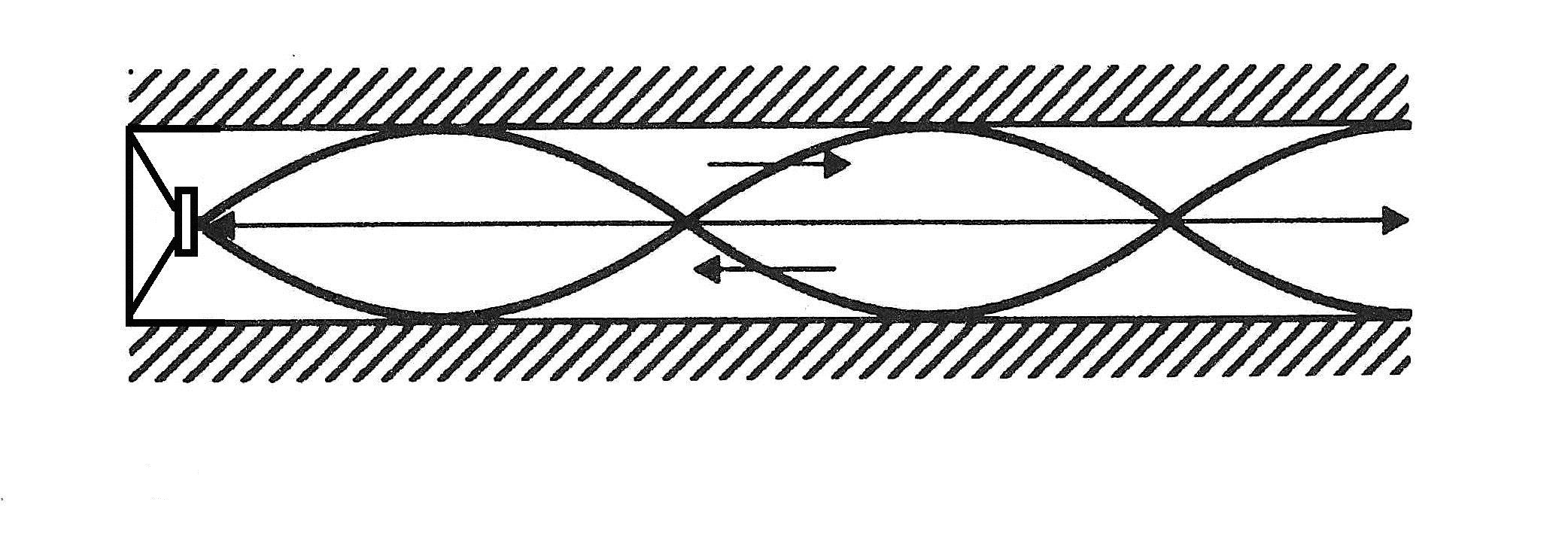
Fig. 1 - Relationship between TL length and wavelength

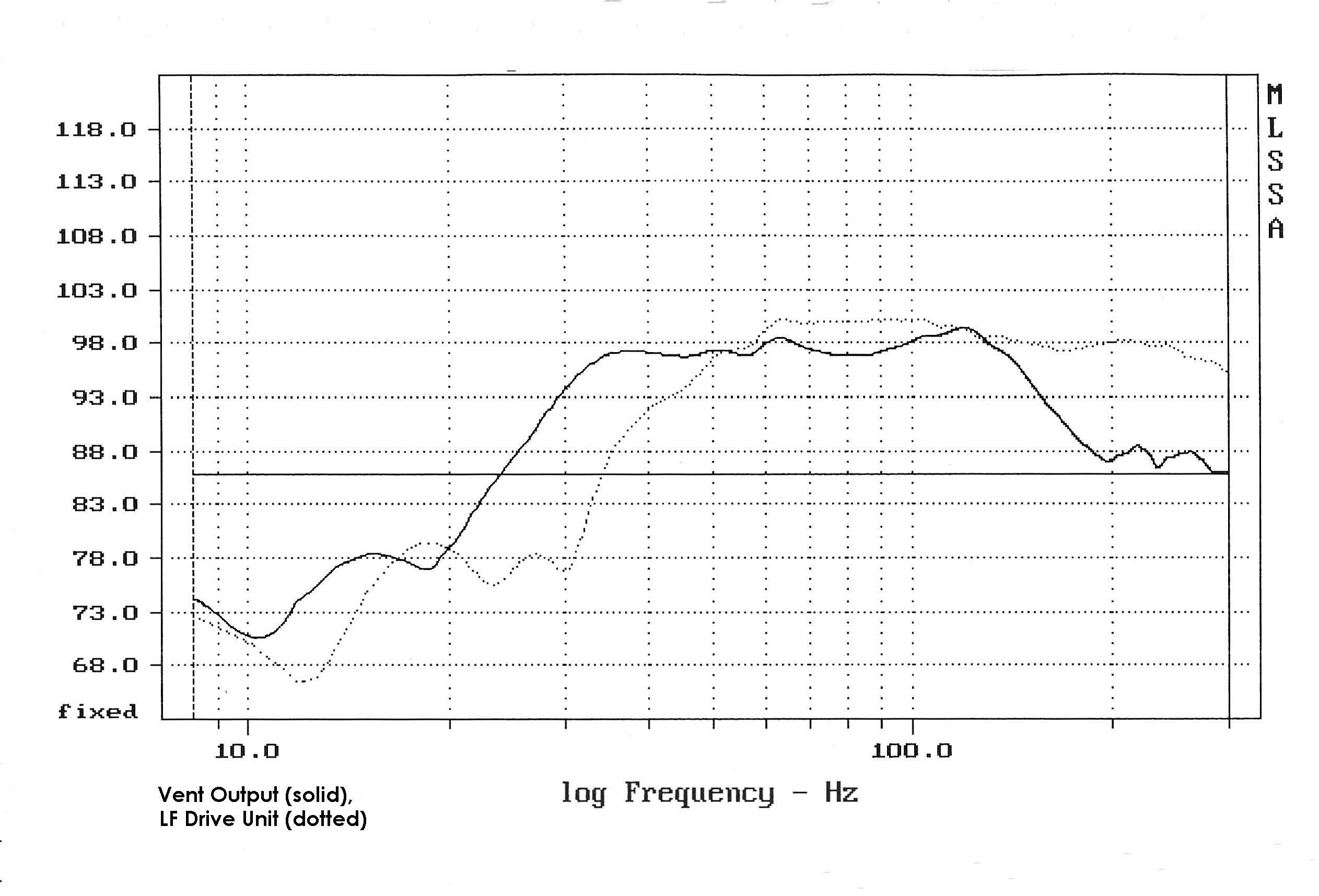
Fig. 2 - Frequency response (magnitude) measurement of drive unit and TL outputs

Phase inversion is achieved by selecting a length of line that is equal to the quarter wavelength of the target lowest frequency. The effect is illustrated in Fig. 1, which shows a hard boundary at one end (the speaker) and the open-ended line vent at the other. The phase relationship between the bass driver and vent is in phase in the pass band until the frequency approaches the quarter wavelength, when the relationship reaches 90 degrees as shown. However, by this time the vent is producing most of the output (Fig. 2). Because the line is operating over several octaves with the drive unit, cone excursion is reduced, providing higher SPLs and lower distortion levels, as compared with bass reflex and infinite baffle loudspeaker enclosure designs.

The complex loading of the bass drive unit demands specific Thiele-Small driver parameters to realise the full benefits of a TL design. Most drive units in the marketplace are developed for the more common reflex and infinite baffle designs and are usually not suitable for TL loading. High-efficiency bass drivers with extended low-frequency ability are usually designed to be extremely light and flexible, having very compliant suspensions. Whilst performing well in a reflex design, these characteristics do not match the demands of a TL design. The drive unit is effectively coupled to a long column of air which has mass. This lowers the resonance frequency of the drive unit, negating the need for a highly compliant device. Furthermore, the column of air provides greater force on the driver itself than a driver opening onto a large volume of air (in simple terms, it provides more resistance to the driver's attempt to move it), so to control the movement of air requires an extremely rigid cone to avoid deformation and consequent distortion.

The introduction of the absorption materials reduces the velocity of sound through the line, as discovered by Bailey in his original work. Bradbury published his extensive tests to determine this effect in an AES journal article in 1976, and his results agreed that heavily damped lines could reduce the velocity of sound by as much as 50%, although 35% is typical in medium damped lines. The behaviour of various damping materials has also been studied by Lusztak and Bujacz. Bradbury's tests were carried out using fibrous materials, typically long-haired wool and glass fibre. However, these kinds of materials produce highly variable effects that are not consistently repeatable for production purposes. They are also liable to produce inconsistencies due to movement, climatic factors and effects over time. High specification acoustic foams, developed by manufacturers such as PMC, with similar characteristics to longhaired wool, provide repeatable results for consistent production. The density of the polymer, the diameter of the pores and the sculptured profiling are all specified to provide the correct absorption for each speaker model. The quantity and position of the foam is critical to engineer a low-pass acoustic filter that provides adequate attenuation of the upper bass frequencies, whilst allowing an unimpeded path for the low bass frequencies. Although the result may require a lot of modeling and testing, the starting point is usually based on one of three basic principles. Filling the entire tube treats the TL as a damper, aiming at completely eliminating the rear wave. Filling half the cross section throughout the line's entire length treats the TL as an infinite baffle, basically damping high frequencies and wall-to-wall resonances. Filling the tube from the driver to half the tube's length aims at a quarter-wave resonator, leaving the fundamental tone with its velocity maxima at the open end of the tube intact, while damping all the overtones.

=== Mathematical equations, modelling, and design process ===
The external links section of this article links to a number of resources that detail the mathematical principles, models, and DIY calculations, as well as extended practical design material, related to transmission line speakers.

For most of the 20th century, transmission line design remained more of an art than a science, requiring much trial and error. Jon Risch states in an article on classic transmission line design that the hard part was finding the best stuffing density along the line's length, because "the line stuffing affects both the total apparent line length AND the total apparent box volume simultaneously". He summarized the state of design at the time as:

"The classic transmission line bass enclosure has never been completely and successfully modeled such that it can be built from a pat set of equations. Some claim to have done this, but it doesn't seem to allow a first time build without adjustments, so the models have enough wrong to require a fudge factor..."

Dave D'Lugos, founder of fan site t-linespeakers.org, comments that this reflects the "classical" designs from the 1960s until Risch's writing, during which period "TL design was seat of the pants".

However, from the 21st Century, Martin King and George Augspurger (both separately and referencing each other's works), produced models which show these to be "generally less than optimal" designs which "did a good job of approaching what was possible in their day". Audio engineer Augspurger had modeled TLs using an electrical analogy, and found it to agree closely with King's existing work, based on a mechanical analogy. D'Lugos concluded in his overview of TL modeling and design theory: "I think that using modern drivers and tools such as King's software you can build a better TL easier today".

More recently, Andrea Rubino has developed a sophisticated simulation model based on electrical circuit theory and published a series of articles in the Italian electroacoustic journal AUDIOreview. Many resources are available on his website: transmissionlinespeakers.com

In addition to these more sophisticated models a number of approximation algorithms exist. One such is to design a closed-box loudspeaker enclosure, then building a transmission line of the same volume tuned to the closed-box loudspeaker's resonance frequency. Another is to design a bass reflex loudspeaker, again building a transmission line of the same volume, tuned to the frequency of the Helmholtz resonator.

== Prominent individuals and companies ==
Pioneers:

- Benjamin Olney – originated the idea of a duct in speaker enclosure design, which he termed an "acoustic labyrinth", while working for Stromberg-Carlson as an acoustic engineer and studying the effect of enclosure size on output sound.
- Bailey and Radford – worked together and developed the concept for loudspeakers (1965). Their design was a significant development from the earlier work. Bailey's name was on the article and Radford built the first commercial TL speaker.
- Irving M. "Bud" Fried – American audiophile and TL advocate, who encountered Wright and Hayes in 1968, recognized the potential of Wright's unnamed speaker, and began marketing their TL speakers in the United States. Later set up a TL company of his own to design speakers.
- Bo Hansson – Swedish designer of HiFi equipment and founder of Opus3 Record Company created the "Rauna Njord" concrete speaker as a transmission line design.
- Bo Bengtsson – Swedish designer of speakers and founder of Audiotronic Company created the "CM3" and "CM3 Pro" speakers as transmission line designs.

Other companies and individuals who have produced or researched TL speakers:

- Newtronics (Temperance line)
- Rega (their Naos then RS7)
- Marantz (Karoke range)

== See also ==
- Acoustic suspension – a method of loudspeaker cabinet design and utilisation that uses one or more loudspeaker drivers mounted in a sealed box or cabinet.
- Bass reflex – a type of loudspeaker enclosure that uses a port (hole) or vent cut into the cabinet and a section of tubing or pipe affixed to the port.
- Frequency response
- Loudspeaker acoustics
- Loudspeaker enclosure
- Loudspeaker measurement
- Passive radiator
