= List of Bose portable audio products =

The portable audio products sold by Bose Corporation have been marketed as portable smart speaker and SoundLink. These wireless speaker systems are battery powered and play audio over a wireless connection from a separate source device (such as a computer or smartphone). Most Soundlink models use Bluetooth to communicate with the source device.

== Models ==
=== SoundLink ===
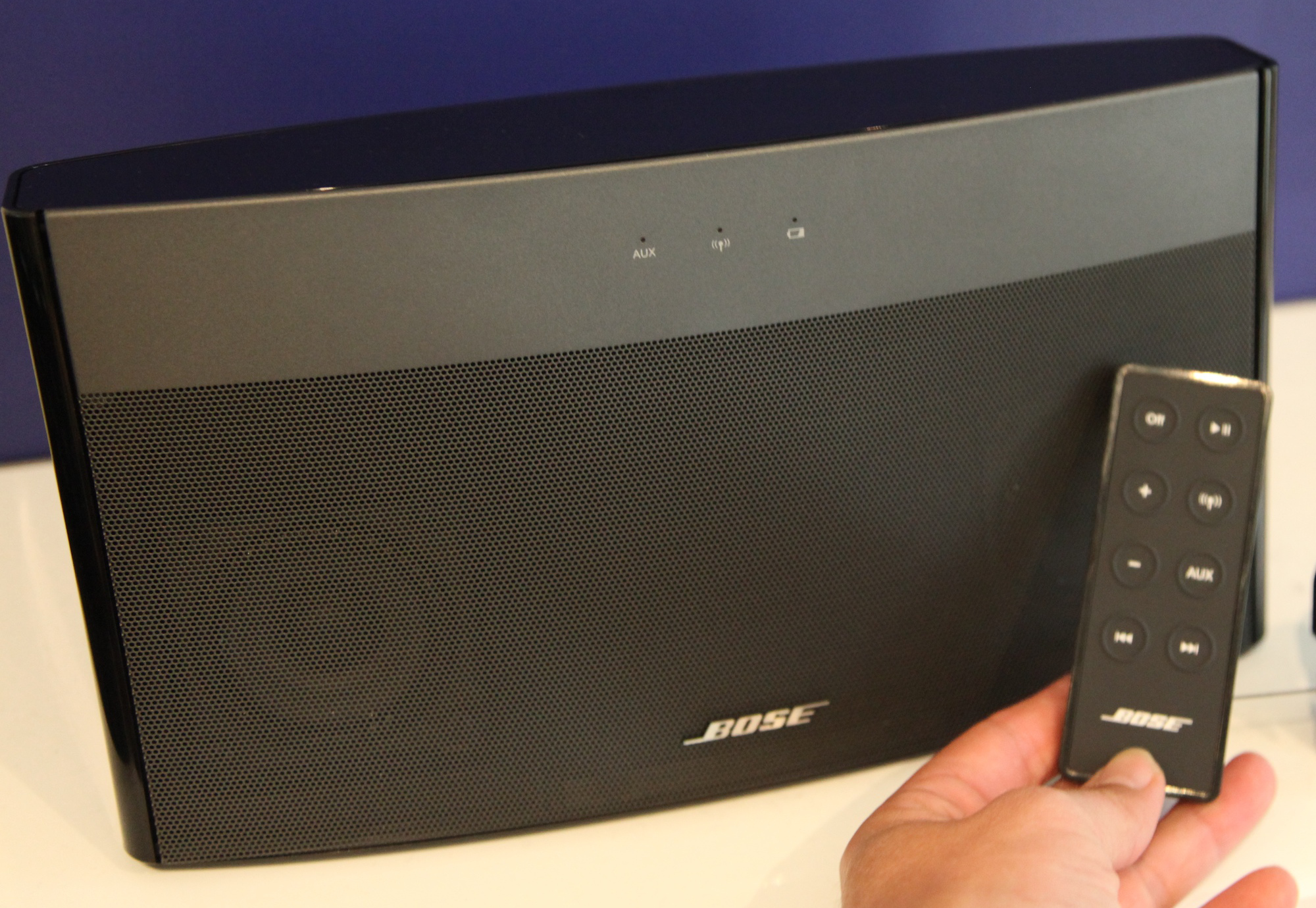
SoundLink

The first SoundLink product was released in 2009 and used a USB wireless transmitter plugged into the computer to receive audio from the computer (using a proprietary protocol— not Bluetooth). The system included a remote control. Reviewers criticized the high price of US$550.

=== SoundLink Mobile ===
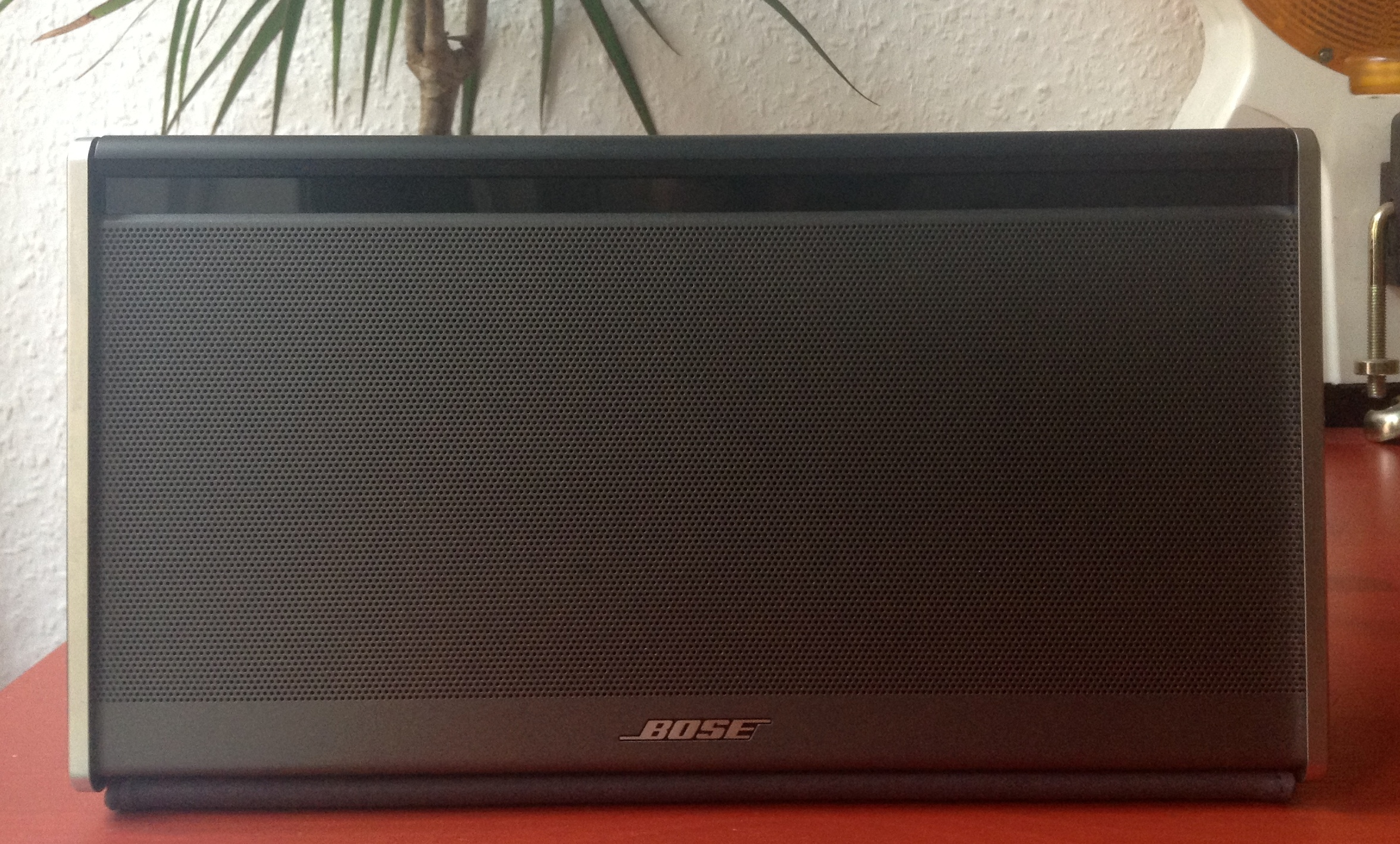
SoundLink Mobile (first version)

The SoundLink Mobile was released in 2011 as a smaller, battery-powered model. It used Bluetooth to communicate with the source device. Reviewers praised the unit's audio quality, but criticized the high price and lack of a microphone (to enable its use as a speakerphone).

The SoundLink Mobile was replaced by the SoundLink Bluetooth Mobile Speaker II, sold from 2012 until 2014. It included a rechargeable battery that was rated at up to 8 hours of playback at moderate volume levels. The rear of the device includes a 3.5 mm auxiliary input. The appearance is very similar to its predecessor, with the biggest change being the folding arrangement of the front cover.

Reviewers praised the updated version for its audio quality and high volume for a compact device, but criticized its high price and the lack of a speakerphone function. It was classified as an Editors Choice' product by PC Magazine.

=== SoundLink Mini ===
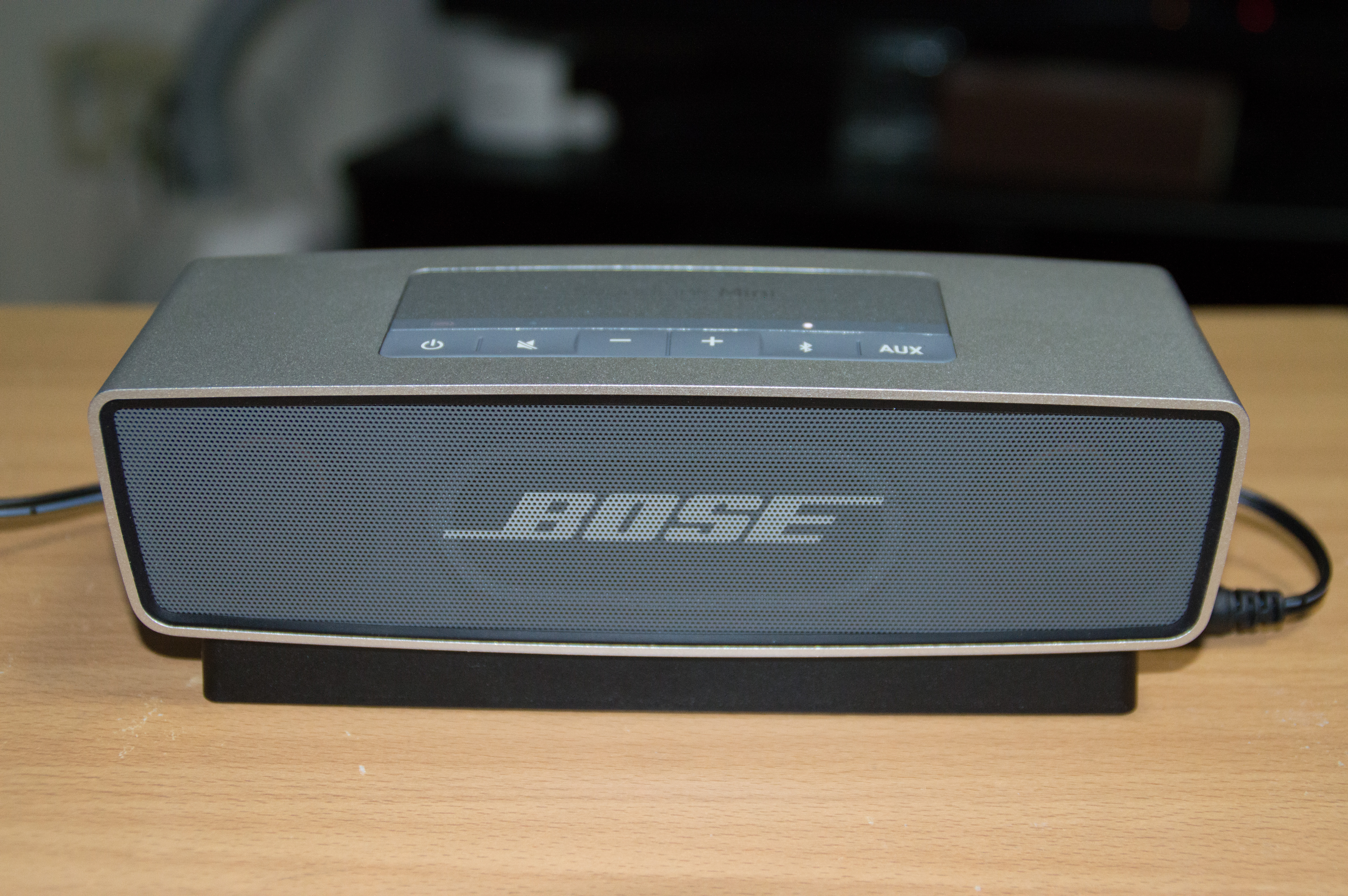
SoundLink Mini

The SoundLink Mini was released in 2013 as a smaller model below the SoundLink Mobile. It weighed 0.7 kg (1.5 lb). Reviewers praised the sound quality and build quality, but criticized the lack of a microphone.

The SoundLink Mini II replaced the SoundLink Mini in 2015. This featured the same sound quality and shape as the original SoundLink Mini with a few subtle changes. Firstly the controls on the top of the speaker changed from 6 to 5 individual buttons, removing the mute button and AUX button (The speaker changed to AUX automatically when it received a 3.5mm input) and added a multifunction button which could perform a variety of functions such as play, pause, and answer calls (due to the added speakerphone capability). The other major change to series 2 was the change from DC charging to USB charging, which provided a more convenient charging solution. The USB charging port also allowed the user to install software updates through btu.bose.com when available. The SoundLink Mini II was quietly discontinued in late 2018, favoring the newly released Revolve and Revolve+. However, due to high production numbers, it was still readily available as of late 2019.

On 31 October 2019, Bose announced the SoundLink Mini II Special Edition. This featured the same design as the standard edition. However, it featured a better battery, which was capable of 12 hours of playtime and chargeable in 4 hours, as well as a USB-C port. The Special Edition is available in 2 colors, Triple Black and Luxe Silver.

SoundLink Revolve

After a deployment of earlier models, Bose launched the model Revolve and Revolve Plus on 13 April 2017. Some salient features are immersive & 360 degrees sound, water-resistant design (IPX4), durable, seamless aluminium body, NFC pairing for secure connectivity to your NFC-enabled devices.

The speaker's bottom has some connections that can be used with a charging cradle that can charge the speaker without connecting a charging cable.

SoundLink Revolve II and Revolve + II are launched as a successor to Revolve and Revolve +. Internals have been upgraded from IPX4 to IP55, battery life has been upgraded. Whereas the design remains same.

SoundLink Color

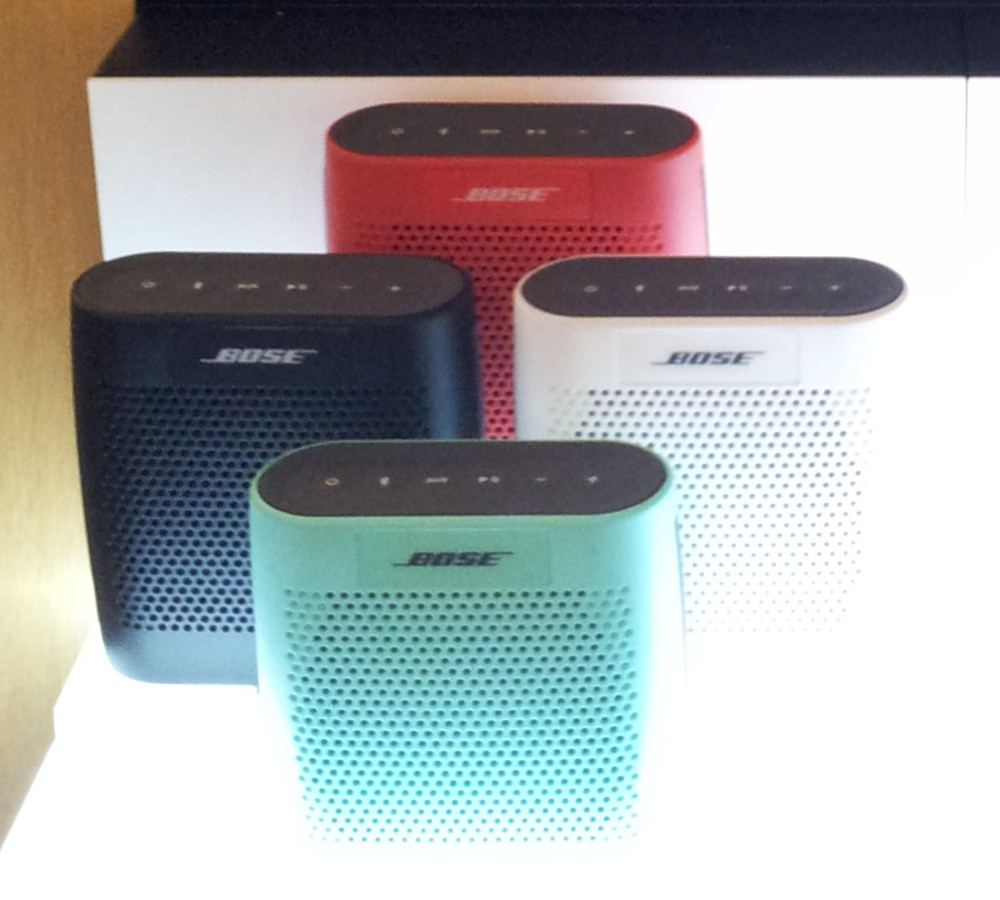
SoundLink Color

The SoundLink Color was introduced in 2015 as Bose's portable Bluetooth loudspeaker. It was battery-powered, and charging was via a micro-USB port.

The original SoundLink Color was replaced by the SoundLink Color II in 2016, which had a slimmer design and remains on sale as of June 2019.

=== SoundLink Micro ===
The SoundLink Micro was released on 21 September 2017. To date, it is the cheapest and smallest Bluetooth speaker offered by Bose. Even with its small size, it can be pretty loud. The main body is made up of silicon rubber, making it extremely durable and IPX7 water resistant. It is available in 3 colors: Blue, Black and Orange. A new addition to this series comes with a tear-proof strap on its back, which can be strapped onto bikes or backpacks. It supports Google Assistant and Siri as well.

This speaker uses a Micro USB charger with a charging cable included in the box. It has a battery life of 6 hours when fully charged.

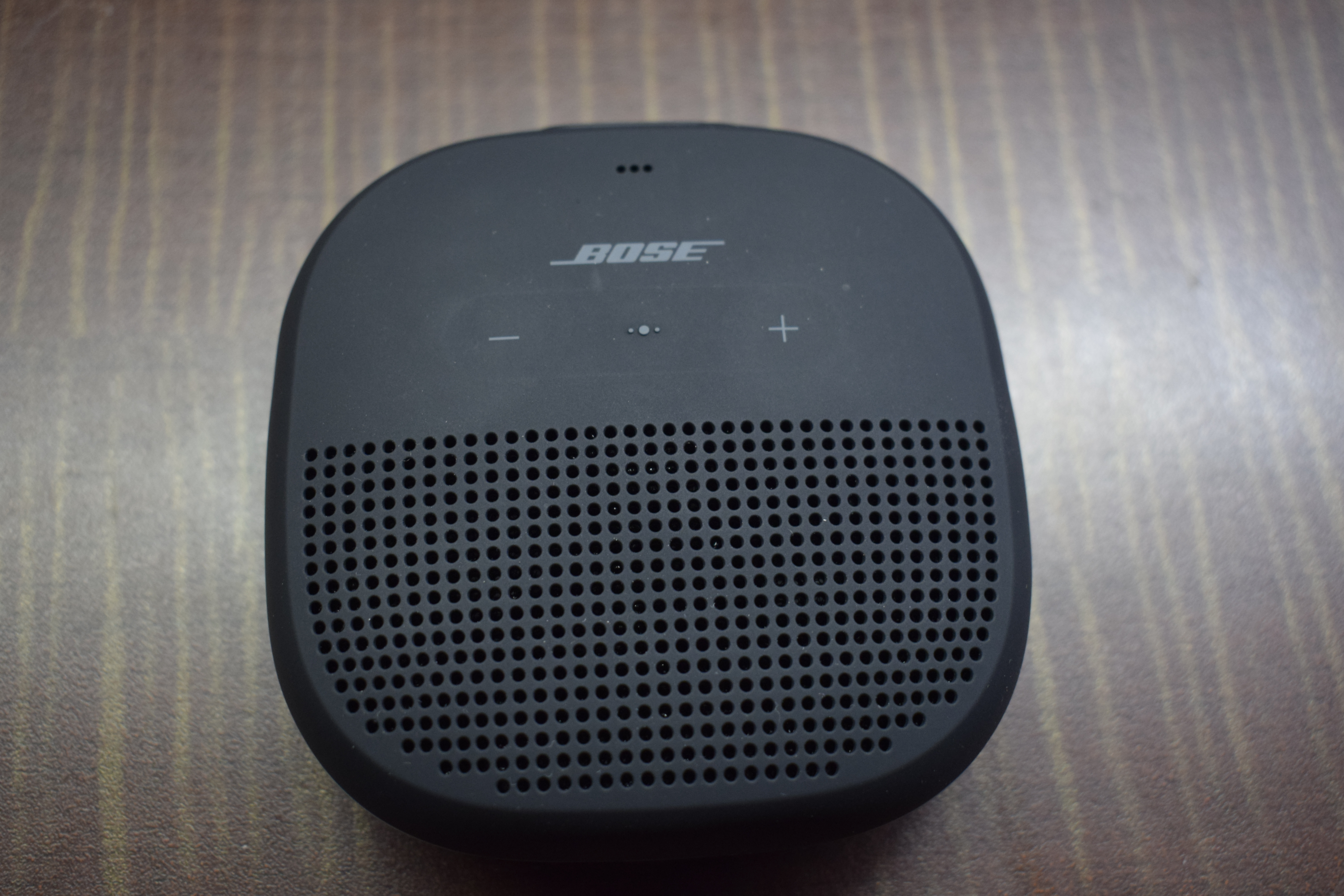
Bose SoundLink Micro

With an output of 5 watt, it can easily power a small gathering.

=== SoundLink Flex & SoundLink Flex Gen 2 ===
The SoundLink Flex was released on 21 October 2021. The SoundLink Flex Gen 2 was released during the summer of 2025.

=== SoundLink Max ===
The SoundLink Max was released on 16th May 2024 for $399. As of 2024, it is the biggest sounding portable speaker designed by Bose. The system uses Bose articulated array with 3 transducers across the front speaker to deliver a spacious stereo sound. Two custom designed passive radiators are responsible for its big bass.

Audio can also be personalized. Bass, mid-range, and treble can be adjusted using the Bose app. According to Bose, this speaker is built to last. It can withstand bumps, drops, and bangs, it won’t peel or flake, and is resistant to corrosion and UV light unlike their predecessors. It also has IP67 rating.

SounLink Max can play music for up to 20 hours, and if the mobile’s battery start to run low, the USB-C port can charge the mobile device. It comes in Black or Blue Dusk color. It uses Bluetooth 5.3 and supports SBC and AAC codec standards. For HD audio, it uses Snapdragon Sound, which automatically adapts up to lossless quality. It also offers Google Fast Pair for added ease of use when pairing Android devices.

=== SoundLink Plus ===
The SoundLink Plus was released on 26th June 2025 for $269. It has many of the features of the SoundLink Max. The speaker features a new acoustic architecture with one subwoofer, a tweeter, and four passive radiators. It weighs 3.4 pounds and measures 9.1″ wide x 3.9″ high x 3.4″ deep.

== See also ==
- Bluetooth
- Loudspeaker
