= Bass reflex =

Type of loudspeaker enclosure with improved bass performance

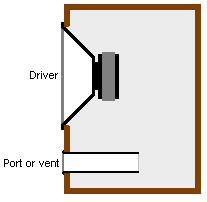
Bass reflex enclosure schematic (cross-section).

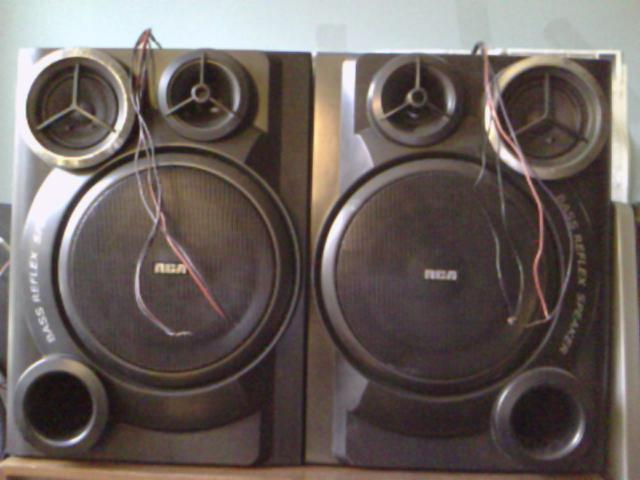
RCA bass reflex shelf stereo speakers.

A bass reflex system (also known as a ported, vented box or reflex port) is a type of loudspeaker enclosure that uses a port (hole) or vent cut into the cabinet and a section of tubing or pipe affixed to the port. This port enables the sound from the rear side of the diaphragm to increase the efficiency of the system at low frequencies as compared to a typical sealed- or closed-box loudspeaker or an infinite baffle mounting.

A reflex port is the distinctive feature of this popular enclosure type. The design approach enhances the reproduction of the lowest frequencies generated by the woofer or subwoofer. The port generally consists of one or more tubes or pipes mounted in the front (baffle) or rear face of the enclosure. Depending on the exact relationship between driver parameters, the enclosure volume (and filling if any), and the tube cross-section and length, the efficiency can be substantially improved over the performance of a similarly sized sealed-box enclosure.

== Explanation ==
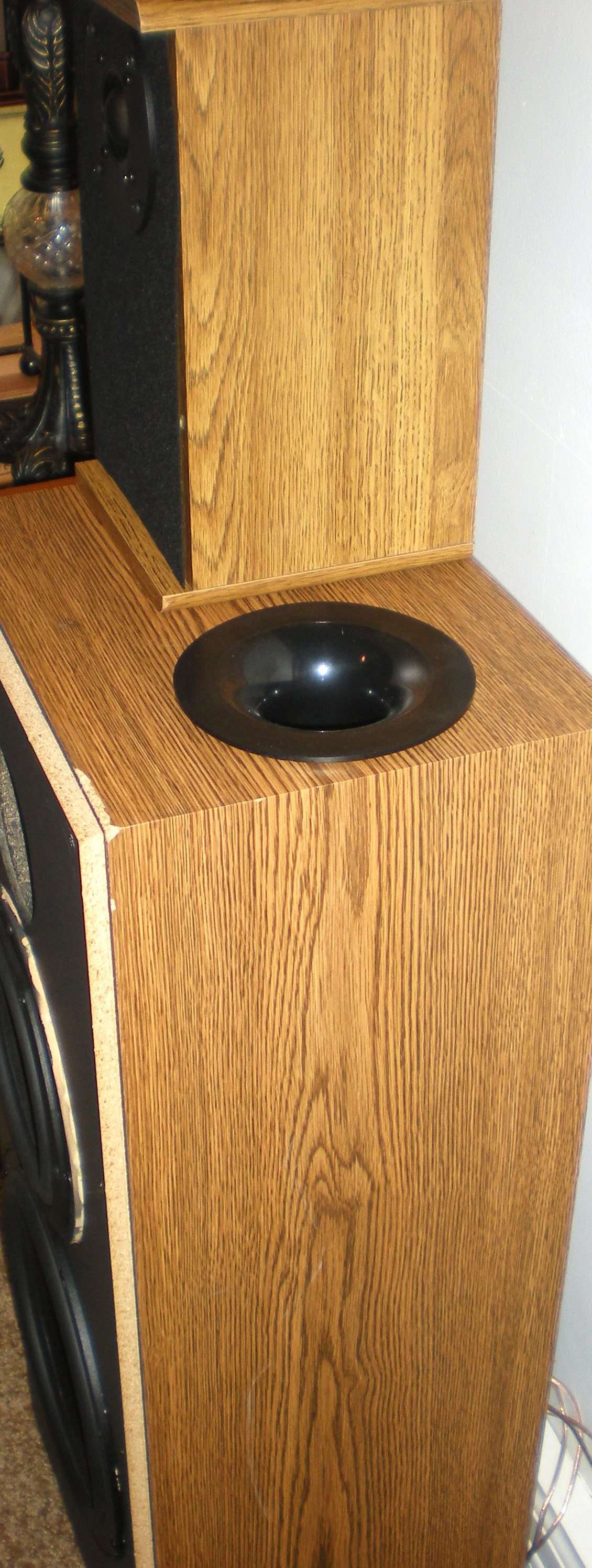
Two-inch port tube installed in the top of a Polk S10 speaker cabinet as part of a DIY audio project. This port is flared.

Unlike closed-box loudspeakers, which are nearly airtight, a bass reflex system has an opening called a port or vent cut into the cabinet, generally consisting of a pipe or duct (typically circular or rectangular cross section). The air mass in this opening resonates with the "springiness" of the air inside the enclosure in exactly the same fashion as the air in a bottle resonates when a current of air is directed across the opening. Another metaphor often used is to think of the air like a spring or rubber band. The frequency at which the box/port system resonates, known as the Helmholtz resonance, depends upon the effective length and cross sectional area of the duct, the internal volume of the enclosure, and the speed of sound in air. In the early years of ported speakers, speaker designers had to do extensive experimentation to determine the ideal diameter of the port and length of the port tube or pipe; however, more recently, there are numerous tables and computer programs that calculate, for a given size of cabinet, how large the port should be and how long the tube should be. Even with these programs, however, some experimentation with prototypes is still necessary to determine if the enclosure sounds good.

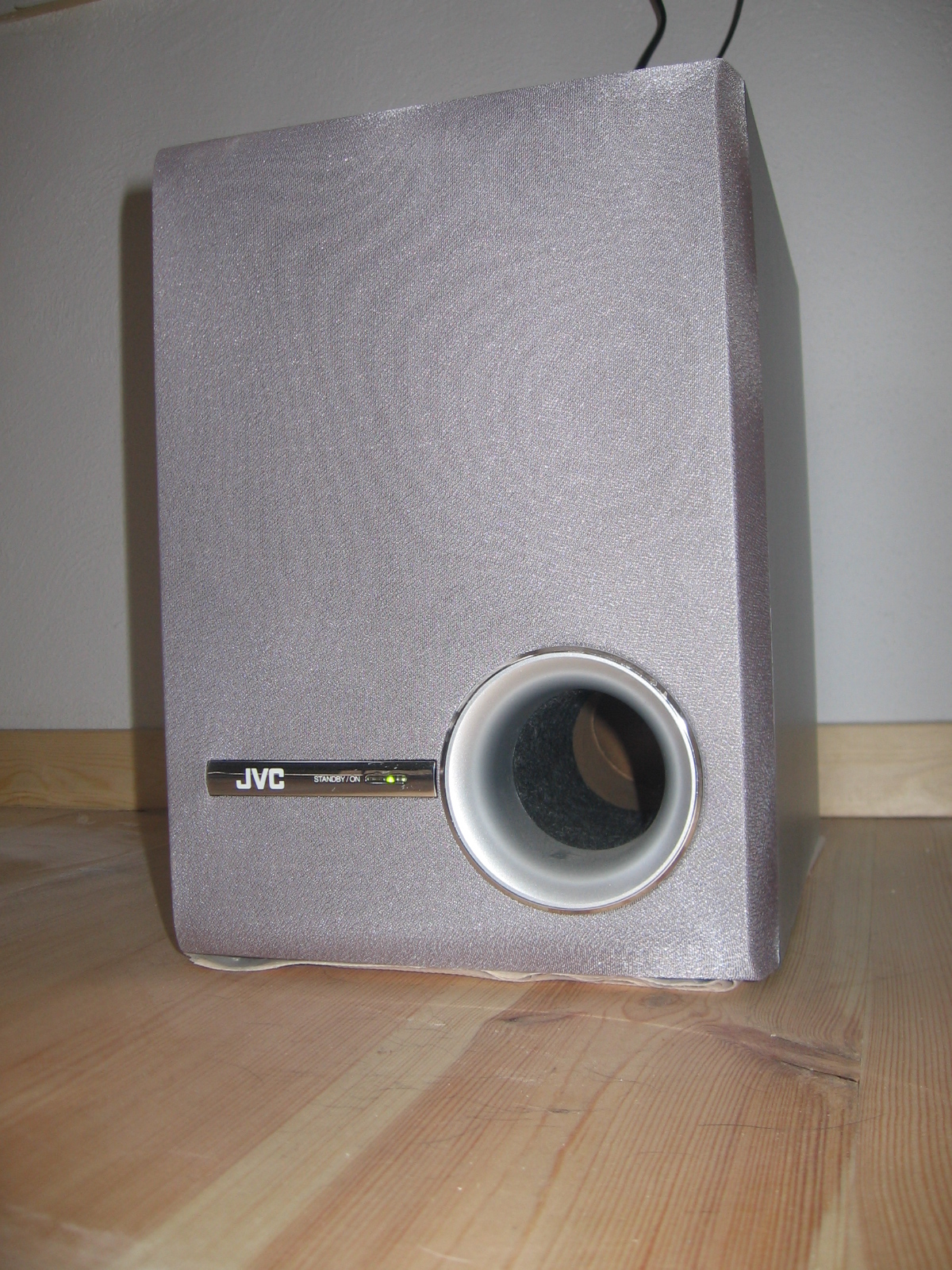
A small JVC speaker with a port.

If this vent air mass/box air springiness resonance is so chosen as to lie lower in frequency than the natural resonance frequency of the bass driver, an interesting phenomenon happens: the backwave of the bass driver sound emission is inverted in polarity for the frequency range between the two resonances. Since the backwave is already in opposite polarity with the front wave, this inversion brings the two emissions in phase (although the vent emission is lagging by one wave period) and therefore they reinforce each other. This has the useful purpose of producing higher output (for any given driver excursion compared to a closed box) or, conversely, a similar output with a smaller excursion (which means less driver distortion). The penalty incurred for this reinforcement is time smearing: in essence the vent resonance augments main driver output by imposing a "resonant tail" on it. For frequencies above the natural resonance of the driver, the reflex alignment has no influence. For frequencies below the vent resonance, polarity inversion is not accomplished, and backwave cancellation occurs. Furthermore, the driver behaves as though suspended in free air, as box air springiness is absent.

When speakers are designed for home use or for high-volume live performance settings (e.g., with bass amplifier speaker cabinets and PA system speakers and subwoofers), manufacturers often consider the advantages of porting (increased bass response, lower bass distortion, improved efficiency) to outweigh the disadvantages (port noise, resonance problems). The design is popular among consumers and manufacturers (speakers cabinets can be smaller and lighter, for more or less equivalent performance), but the increase in bass output requires close matching of driver, enclosure size, and port tuning. Poorly matched bass reflex designs can have unfortunate characteristics or drawbacks, sometimes making them unsuitable for settings requiring high accuracy and neutrality of sound, e.g., studio monitor speakers for use by audio engineers in monitoring facilities, recording studios, etc. However, it is possible to design a bass reflex system that mostly overcomes these drawbacks; and quality bass reflex designs are commonly found in demanding environments across the world.

== Comparison with passive radiator ==
Passive radiator enclosure with front mounted passive radiator; back or side mounting is also used.

Passive radiators are similar in operation to ported bass reflex systems, and both methods are used for the same reason: to extend the system's low frequency response. A passive radiator is the use of one or more additional cones (diaphragms) in a cabinet instead of ports. These passive diaphragms do not have a magnet or voice coil and are not connected to a power amplifier. Acoustically, they behave largely the same around their tuning frequency as a port, as they also act as a Helmholtz resonator excited by the rear side of the bass driver's diaphragm. Passive radiators can be tuned independent of their dimensions by adding or removing mass from the diaphragm of the passive radiator. This makes them useful for smaller enclosures with the same box tuning where an equivalently tuned port would be impractical. They also sidestep the midrange pipe resonances that can be an issue on ported enclosures in full range systems. However, to be effective, they require a much greater surface area on the cabinet exterior than a port. They are also considerably more expensive than a port tube, as they are effectively a speaker driver minus its voice coil and motor magnet.

== History ==
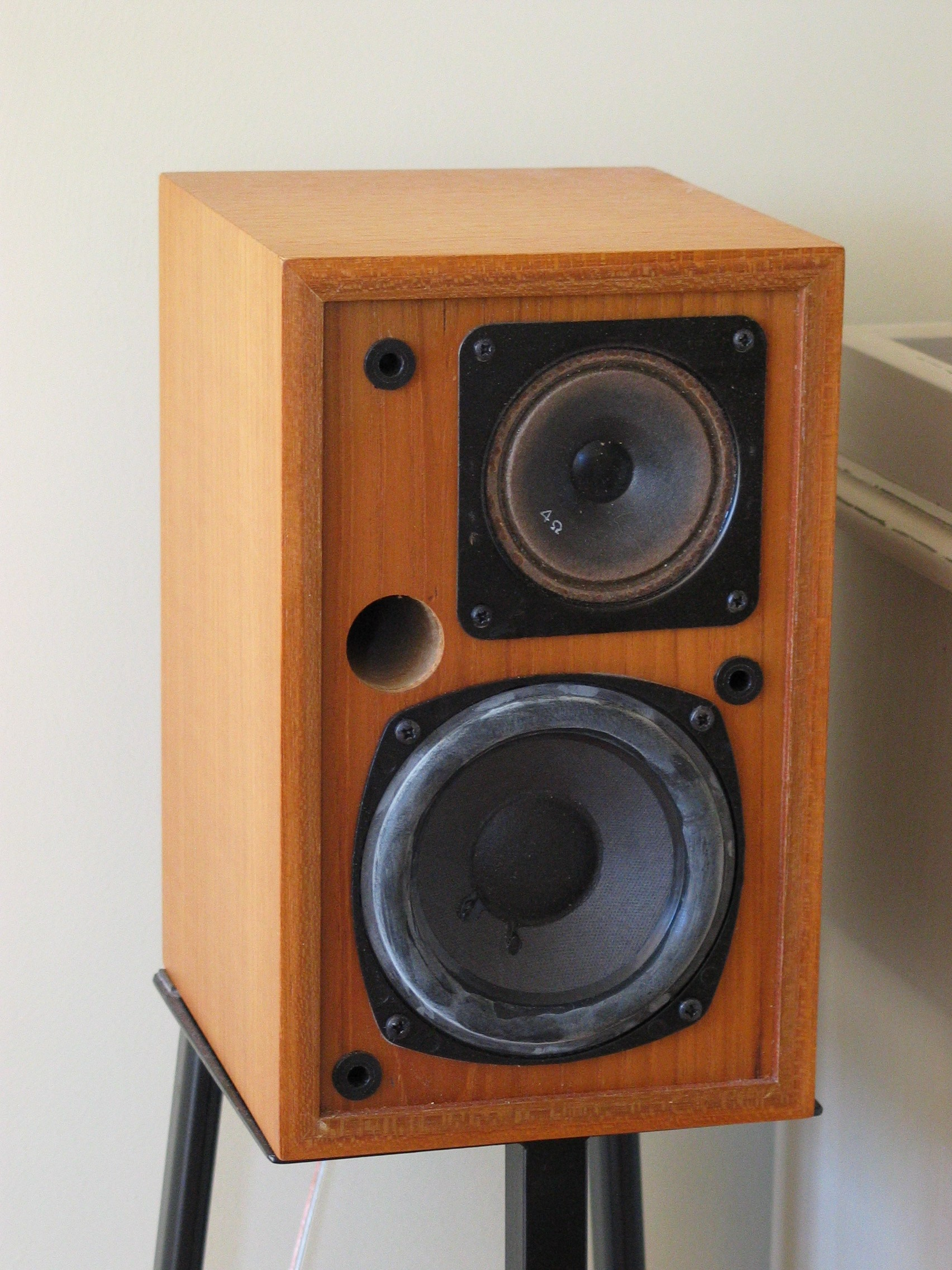
A small Keesonic Kub speaker. With the front grille removed, the port is visible between the two drivers.

The effect of the various speaker parameters, enclosure sizes and port (and duct) dimensions on the performance of bass reflex systems was not well understood until the early 1960s. Subsequently, pioneering analyses by A.N. Thiele, J.E. Benson and Richard H. Small presented the theoretical foundations for the synthesis of bass reflex loudspeaker systems to meet specified low-frequency performance criteria were developed into a series of "alignments" (sets of the relevant speaker parameters) that allowed designers to produce useful, predictable responses. Keele extended the design options by presenting a new set of 6th-order vented-box loudspeaker system alignments. All of these results made it possible for speaker manufacturers to design bass reflex loudspeakers to match various sizes of enclosures, and to match enclosures to given speakers with great predictability. Due to the physical electromechanical constraints, it is not possible to have a small speaker in a small enclosure producing extended bass response at high efficiencies (i.e., requiring only a low-powered amplifier). It is possible to have two of these attributes, but not all; this has been termed Hofmann's Iron Law after J. Anton Hofmann of KLH's summary (with Henry Kloss) of Edgar Villchur work years earlier. The sound pressure produced depends upon the efficiency of the speaker, the mechanical or thermal power handling of the driver, the power input and the size of the driver.

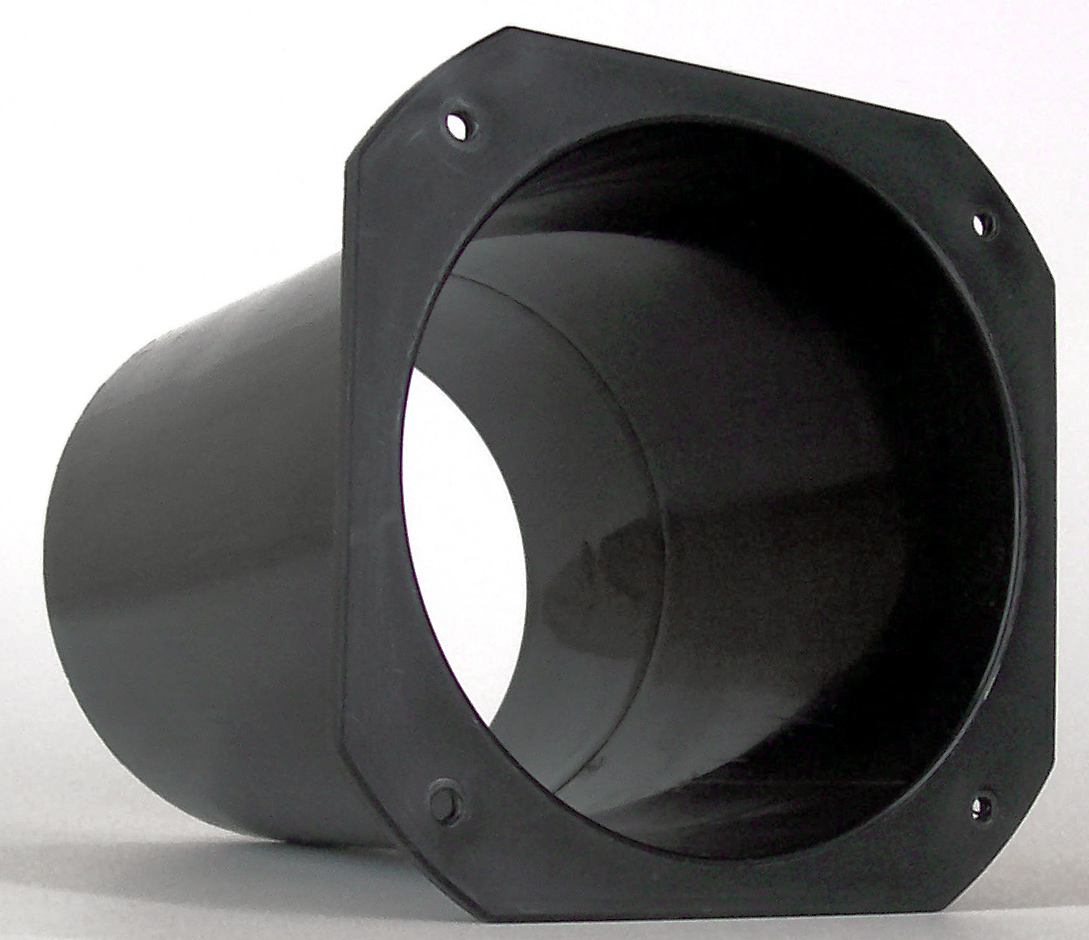
Bass reflex vent.

== Advantages ==
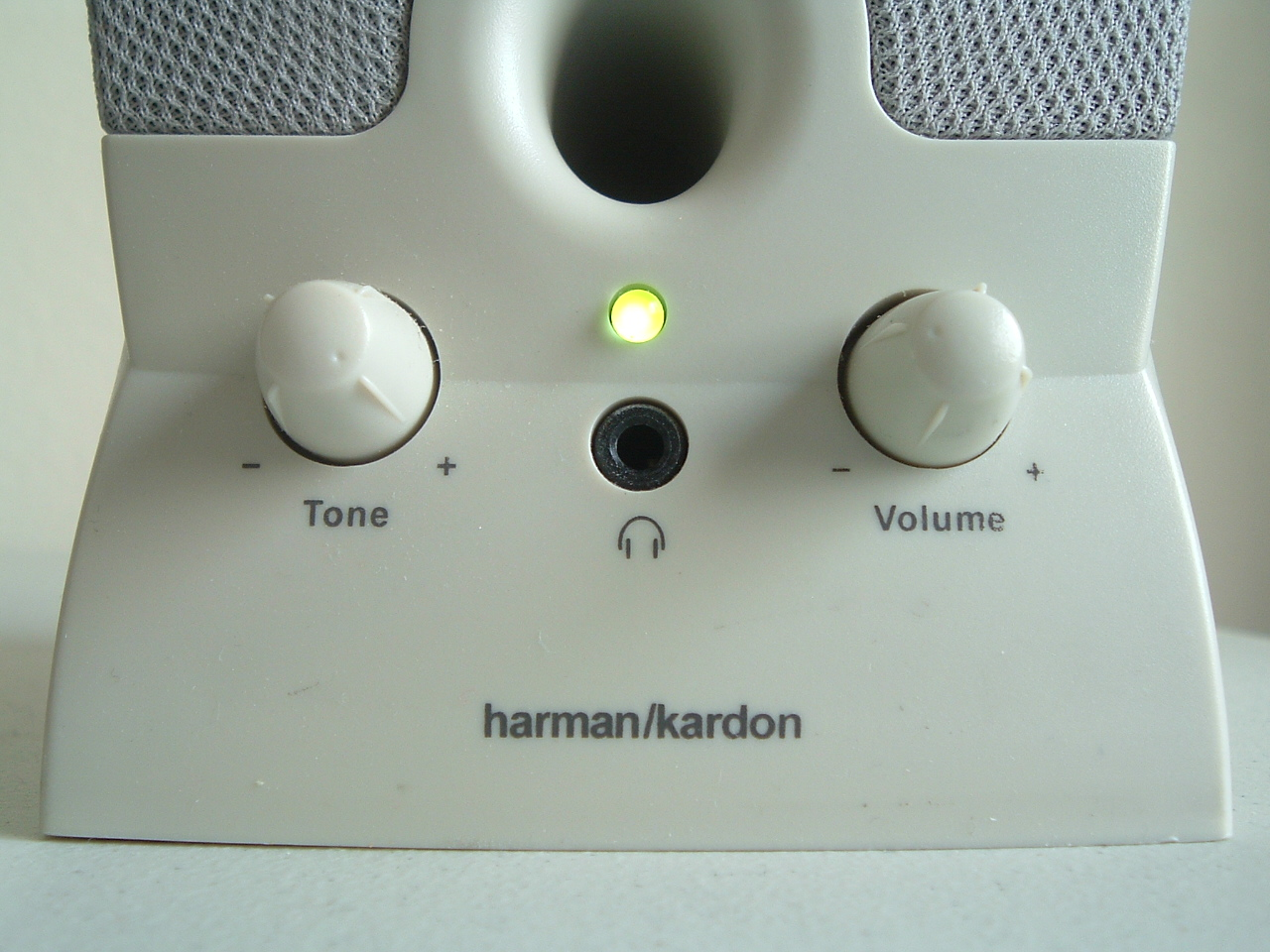
A small plastic Harman Kardon powered computer speaker with a bass reflex port.

Novak concluded that a bass reflex enclosure can have greater acoustic output for a given amount of distortion, lower total harmonic intermodulation, and transient distortion than a completely closed-box of similar size. Such a resonant system augments the bass response of the driver and, if designed properly, can extend the frequency response of the driver/enclosure combination to below the range the driver would reproduce in a similarly sized sealed box. The enclosure resonance has a secondary benefit in that it limits cone movement in a band of frequencies centered around the tuning frequency, reducing distortion in that frequency range. Ported cabinet systems are cheaper than a passive radiator speaker with the same performance; whereas a passive radiator system requires one or two "drone cone" speakers, a ported system requires only a hole or port and a length of tubing.

== Limitations ==
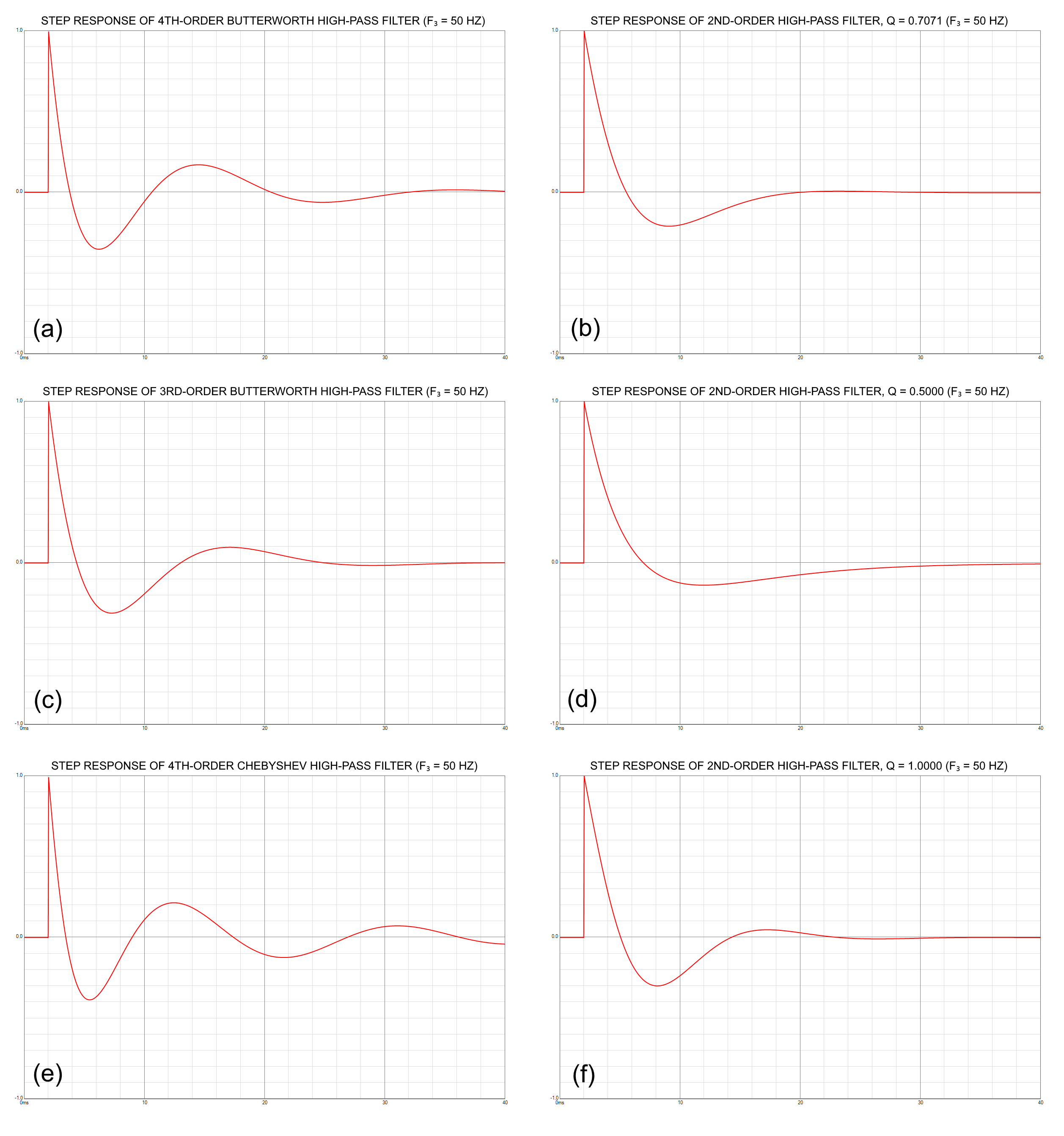
Step responses of various high-pass filter functions, each with a −3 dB cut-off frequency equal to 50 Hz. The step response of a standard B4 vented-box low-frequency alignment is depicted in (a), while that of a standard B2 (Q = 0.7071) closed-box low-frequency alignment is depicted in (b).

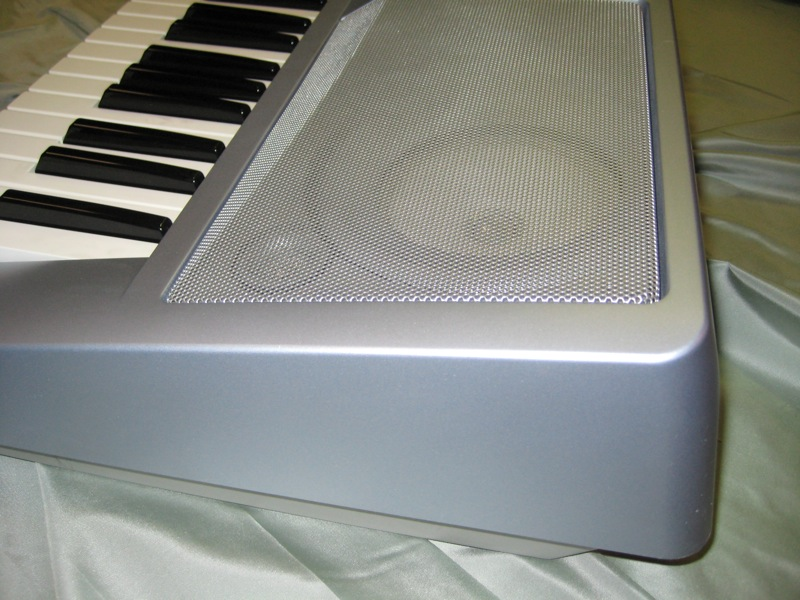
Some electronic keyboards use ported speakers to improve the bass response and sound performance. Pictured here is a Yamaha DGX-202.

Compared to closed-box loudspeakers, bass reflex cabinets have poorer transient response, resulting in longer decay times associated with the bass notes. Some example step responses for various high-pass filter functions are shown in the relevant figure, where each filter has an identical −3 dB cut-off frequency of 50 Hz. In that figure, (a) represents the step response of a conventional B4 vented-box alignment, while (b) represents the step response of a B2 closed-box alignment with Q = 0.7071. The transient response of a vented-box loudspeaker can be improved by choosing a QB3 alignment similar to (c), which results in a more well damped transient response than that produced by the B4 alignment. However, a C4 vented-box alignment similar to (e) results in a less well damped transient response.

In order to achieve their bass output, ported loudspeaker enclosures stagger two resonances: one from the driver and the boxed air, and another from the boxed air and the port. At the vent tuning frequency, the output from the port is the primary source of sound output, as the displacement of the woofer is at a minimum. This constitutes a more complex, higher-order system than an equivalent closed-box loudspeaker enclosure. The interaction between the two resonances results in a system that possesses less damping and increased time delay (increased group delay). Due to the latter, a flat steady-state bass response does not occur at the same time as the rest of the sonic output at higher frequencies in the operating region. Instead, it starts later (lags) and the lag increases, accumulating over time as a longish resonant "tail" arriving behind the main "body" of the acoustic signal. As a result of their electrodynamic characteristics, ported enclosures, which are well approximated as 4th-order high-pass filter systems, generally result in poorer transient response at low frequencies than do closed-box loudspeaker systems, which are 2nd-order high-pass filter systems.

Another trade-off for this augmentation is that, at frequencies below the vent tuning frequency, the port unloads the cone and allows it to move with very large displacements. This means the speaker can be driven past its safe mechanical operating limits at frequencies below the tuning frequency with much less power than in an equivalently-sized sealed enclosure. For this reason, high-powered systems using a bass reflex design are often protected by a high-pass filter that removes signals below the vent tuning frequency. Unfortunately, electrical filtering adds further frequency-dependent group delay. Even if such filtering can be adjusted not to remove musical content, it may interfere with sonic information connected with the size and ambiance of the recording location or venue, information that often exists in the low bass spectrum.

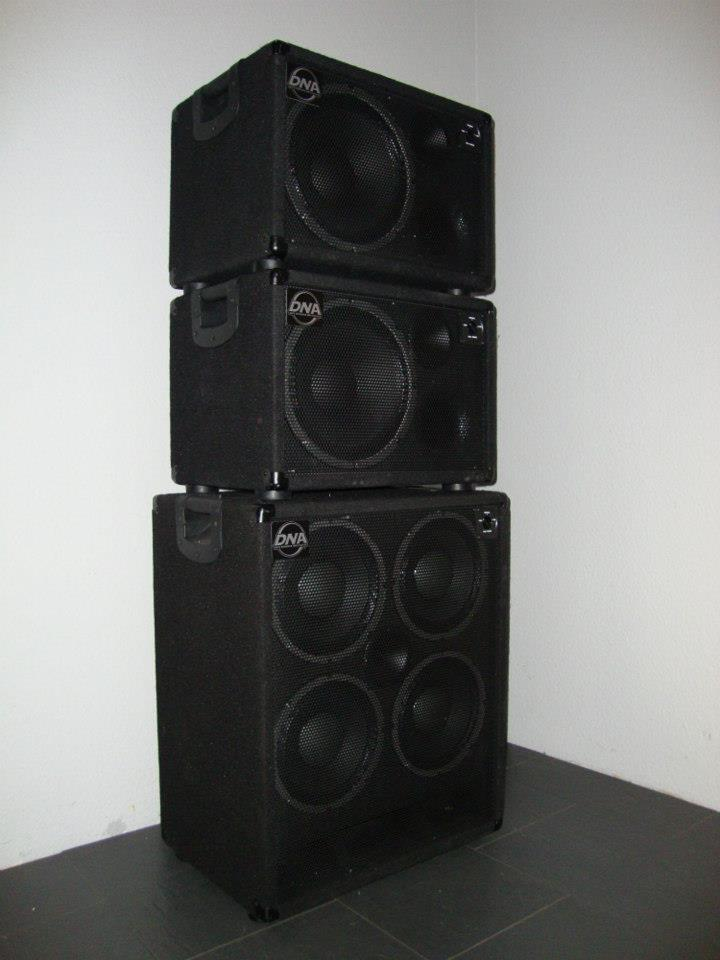
In this stack of bass amplifier speaker enclosures, each cabinet has a port.

Whether or not the effects of these in a properly designed system are audible remains a matter of debate. A poorly designed bass reflex system, generally one whose vent is incorrectly tuned too high or too low in frequency, tends to produce excessive output at the tuning frequency relative to the rest of the pass-band of the loudspeaker system. This behaviour can add a "booming" one-note quality to the reproduction of the bass frequencies. Although some may consider that this is due to the port resonance imposing its characteristics to the note being played, it is simply the result of a non-maximally flat frequency response function. If such a peak in the bass response of a bass reflex enclosure coincides with one of the resonant modes of the room, a not unusual occurrence, the effects will be further exacerbated. In general, the lower in frequency a port is tuned, the less objectionable these problems are likely to be.

Ports often are placed on the front baffle, and may thus allow transmission of unwanted midrange frequencies reflected from within the box into the listening environment. If it is undersized, a port may also generate "wind noise" or "chuffing" sounds, due to the turbulence around the port openings at high air speeds. Enclosures with a rear-facing port mask these effects to some extent, but they cannot be placed directly against a wall without causing audible problems. They require some free space around the port so they can perform as intended. Some manufacturers incorporate a floor-facing port within the speaker stand or base, offering predictable and repeatable port performance within the design constraints.

== Port compression ==
Port compression is a reduction in port effectiveness as sound pressure levels increase. As a ported system plays louder, the efficiency of the port reduces, and distortion emitted by the port increases. This can be reduced by port design, but not totally eliminated. Asymmetrical loading of the driver cone during high level usage can be reduced by placing a baffle at the inside end of the port tube. This baffle can also serve as a stiffening structural element of the enclosure.

== Applications ==
Subwoofer cabinets used in home cinema and sound reinforcement systems are often fitted with ports or vents. Bass amp speaker cabinets and keyboard amp speaker cabinets, which have to reproduce low-frequency sounds down to 41 Hz or below, are often built with ports or vents, which are typically on the front of the cabinet (though they are also placed on the rear). Even some expensive hi-fi speakers have carefully designed ports.

== See also ==
- Acoustic suspension – a method of loudspeaker cabinet design and utilisation that uses one or more loudspeaker drivers mounted in a sealed box or cabinet.
- Loudspeaker enclosure
- Passive radiator
- Transmission line loudspeaker
