= Acoustic suspension =

Loudspeaker cabinet design

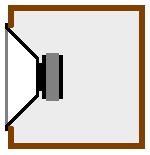
An acoustic suspension loudspeaker is a type of speaker enclosure in which a loudspeaker driver is mounted in a cabinet with a closed back and no ports or vents.

Acoustic suspension is a loudspeaker cabinet design that uses one or more loudspeaker drivers mounted in a sealed box. Acoustic suspension systems reduce bass distortion, which can be caused by stiff suspensions required on drivers used for open cabinet designs.

A compact acoustic suspension loudspeaker was described in 1954 by Edgar Villchur, and it was brought to commercial production by Villchur and Henry Kloss with the founding of Acoustic Research in Cambridge, Massachusetts. In 1960, Villchur reiterated that: The first aim of the acoustic suspension design, over and above uniformity of frequency response, compactness, and extension of response into the low-bass range, is to reduce significantly the level of bass distortion that had previously been tolerated in loudspeakers. This is accomplished by substituting an air-spring for a mechanical one. Subsequently, the theory of closed-box loudspeakers was extensively described by Richard H. Small.

Speaker cabinets with acoustic suspension can provide well-controlled bass response, especially in comparison with an equivalently-sized speaker enclosure that has a bass reflex port or vent. The bass vent boosts low-frequency output, but with the tradeoff of introducing phase delay and accuracy problems in reproducing transient signals. Sealed boxes are generally less efficient than a bass-reflex cabinet for the same low-frequency cut-off and cabinet volume, so a sealed-box speaker cabinet will need more electrical power to deliver the same amount of acoustic low-frequency bass output.

== Theory ==
The acoustic suspension woofer uses the elastic cushion of air within a sealed enclosure to provide the restoring force for the woofer diaphragm. The cushion of air acts like a compression spring. This is in contrast to the stiff physical suspension built into the driver of conventional speakers. Because the air in the cabinet serves to control the excursion of the woofer, the mechanical stiffness of the driver suspension can be reduced. The air suspension provides a more linear restoring force for the woofer's diaphragm, enabling it to oscillate a greater distance (excursion) in a linear fashion. This is a requirement for low distortion and loud reproduction of deep bass by drivers with relatively small cones.

Even though acoustic suspension cabinets are often called sealed box designs, they are not entirely airtight. A small amount of airflow must be allowed so that the speaker can adjust to changes in atmospheric pressure. A semi-porous cone surround allows enough air movement for this purpose. Most Acoustic Research designs used a PVA sealer on the foam surrounds to enable a longer component life and enhance performance. The venting was via the cloth spider and cloth dust caps, and not so much through the cone surround.

Acoustic suspension woofers remain popular in hi-fi systems due to their low distortion. They also have lower group delay at low frequencies compared to bass reflex designs, resulting in better transient response. However, the audibility of this benefit is somewhat contested. As noted by Small, an analysis performed by Thiele suggested that the differences among correctly adjusted systems of both types are likely to be inaudible.

In the 2000s, most subwoofers, bass amplifier cabinets and sound reinforcement system speaker cabinets use bass reflex ports, rather than a sealed-box design, in order to obtain a more extended low-frequency response and to achieve a higher sound pressure level (SPL). The speaker enclosure designers and their customers view the risk of increased distortion and phase delay as an acceptable price to pay for increased bass output and higher maximum SPL.

== Acoustic performance ==
The two most common types of speaker enclosure are acoustic suspension (sometimes called pneumatic suspension) and bass reflex. In both cases, the tuning affects the lower end of the driver's response, but above a certain frequency, the driver itself becomes the dominant factor and the size of the enclosure and ports (if any) becomes irrelevant.

In general, acoustic suspension systems (driver plus enclosure) have a second-order acoustic (12 dB/octave) roll-off below the −3 dB point. Bass reflex designs have a fourth-order acoustic roll-off (24 dB/octave). Given a driver that is suitable for either type of enclosure, the ideal bass reflex cabinet will be larger, have a lower −3 dB point, but both systems will have equal voltage sensitivity in the passband.

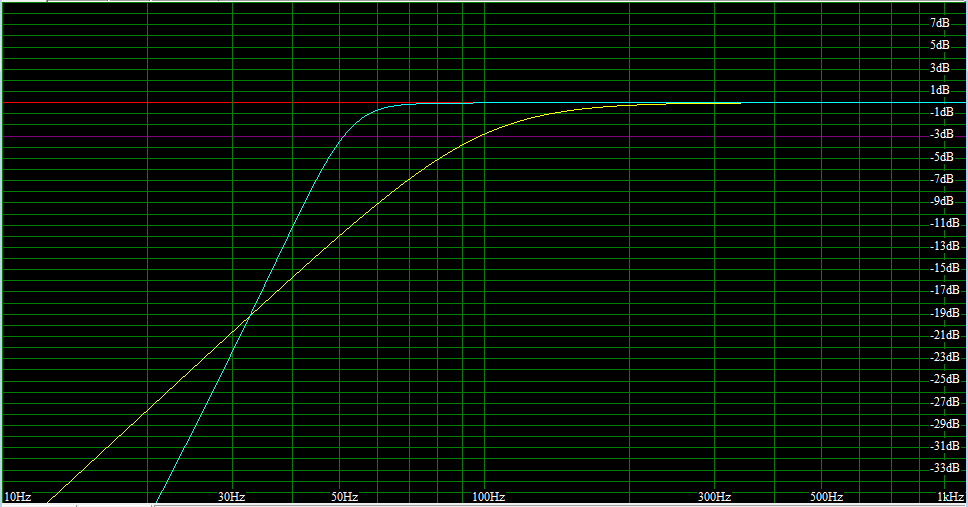
WinISD comparison of a FaitalPRO 5FE120 woofer in a sealed (yellow) and ported (cyan) cabinet. The ported cabinet demonstrates increased bass output in the 50–100 Hz range.

On the right is a simulation of the low-frequency response of a typical 5" mid-woofer, the FaitalPRO 5FE120 mid-woofer generated, obtained using WinISD, for ideal sealed (yellow) and ported (cyan) enclosure configurations. The ported version adds about an octave of bass extension, dropping the −3 dB point from 100 Hz to 50 Hz, but the tradeoff is that the cabinet size is more than twice as large, 8 litres of interior space versus 3.8 litres. It is also worth noting that above 200 Hz the simulations converge and there is no difference in output, and below 32 Hz the sealed enclosure produces more low-frequency output.

Small presented the physical efficiency-bandwidth-volume limitation of closed-box system design. By considering the variation in the reference efficiency of the driver operating in the system enclosure, the relationship of maximum reference efficiency to cut-off frequency and enclosure volume for closed-box loudspeaker systems was determined. Subsequently, Small derived a similar relationship for vented-box loudspeaker systems. When Small compared these two sets of results, they revealed that the closed-box system has a maximum theoretical value of reference efficiency that is 2.9 dB lower than that of the vented-box system. This suggests that an acoustic suspension loudspeaker with the same enclosure volume and low-frequency −3 dB cut-off as a vented-box system will be up to 2.9 dB less sensitive than its counterpart. If the reference efficiency and cut-off frequency of the two systems is the same, then the enclosure volume of the acoustic suspension loudspeaker will be approximately twice as large as that of the vented system.

== In multi-driver loudspeakers ==
While boxed hi-fi speakers are often described as being acoustic suspension or ported (bass reflex), depending on the absence or presence of a port tube or vent, it is also true that, in typical box loudspeakers with more than two drivers, the midrange driver between the woofer and tweeter is usually designed as an acoustic suspension system. Such a midrange driver includes a separate, damped, sealed air-space. However, one notable exception to this was the Sonus Faber Stradivari Homage, which used a ported enclosure for the midrange.

== See also ==
- Passive radiator (speaker)
- Transmission line loudspeaker
