= Irving M. Fried =

American audio engineer

- Born: November 3, 1920
- Died: March 21, 2005 (aged 84)
- Other name: Bud
- Occupation: Audio Engineer

Irving M. "Bud" Fried (November 3, 1920 – March 21, 2005), was an American audiophile of the "Golden Age" of stereophonic reproduction, along with Saul Marantz and David Hafler.

As a young boy, Fried fell in love with the art and science of sound reproduction when he first heard Stokowski and the Philadelphia Orchestra emerging from the large theater horns of his father's movie theaters.

Later, when Fried attended Harvard University, he fell under the sway of Professors Hunt and Pierce who, under a Western Electric research grant, were conducting monumental research into high fidelity phono reproduction. He received his undergraduate degree from Harvard University, and thereafter served as an officer in the United States Navy during World War II. Among his assignments, he was posted as liaison to the Free French Air Force. After the war he attended and graduated from Harvard Law School.

Based on the advice of Victor Brociner, co-founder of the Philharmonic Radio Co., Bud became the official importer of the Lowther corner horns, the creations of P.G.A.H. Voight. A year later, he expanded his offerings and began importing the revolutionary Quad electrostatic.

At the suggestion of Saul Marantz, the IMF (Irving M Fried) trademark was registered in 1961, a trademark that was eventually applied to many advanced developments in music reproduction: cartridges (IMF – London, IMF – Goldring), tone arms (SME, Gould, Audio and Design), amplifiers (Quad, Custom Series), loudspeakers (Lowther, Quad, Celestion, Bowers and Wilkins, Barker, etc.)

In 1968 a British branch of IMF was opened. This combined Anglo-American company produced the now legendary IMF Monitor.

In 1975 the English and American divisions of IMF were split, and the trademark FRIED was thenceforth used on all of Bud's designs. The new designs were based upon the same principles that had created the IMF Monitor in addition to new technology as it became available. FRIED benchmarks include the Model H System, the Model M (1977), the SUPER Monitor, and the B satellite series (1976 to 1979).

Among the many design principles that he utilized, he is best known for his development of loudspeakers for realistic audio reproduction that were based on transmission line loading and resistive series crossover networks.
