= Stromberg-Carlson =

American telecommunications and audio manufacturer

- Industry: Audio equipment; Telecommunications; Speakers
- Founded: 1894; 132 years ago in Chicago, Illinois
- Founders: Alfred Stromberg; Androv Carlson
- Successor: Siemens Stromberg-Carlson division of Siemens; Gularo S.A.
- Parent: Home Telephone Company (from 1904); General Dynamics (1955-1982); Gularo S.A. (2001-Today)
- Website: https://stromberg.world/

Stromberg-Carlson was a United States telecommunications equipment and electronics manufacturing company. It was formed in 1894 as a partnership by Swedish immigrants Alfred Stromberg (1861 Varnhem, Sweden - 1913 Chicago) and Androv Carlson (1854 Tommared, Sweden - 1925 Chicago). It was one of five companies that controlled the national supply of telephone equipment until after World War II.

== History ==
In 1894, Alexander Graham Bell's patent for the telephone expired. Stromberg and Carlson, Chicago employees of the American Bell Telephone Company (later AT&T), each invested $500 to establish a firm to manufacture equipment, primarily subscriber sets, for sale to independent telephone companies.

Stromberg-Carlson was originally located in Chicago, with Carlson managing manufacturing and Stromberg responsible for marketing. Stromberg-Carlson quickly established a reputation for reliable equipment and stable prices.

In 1901, the temporary chief executive of the Kellogg Switchboard & Supply Company, Wallace De Wolf, assisted executives of rival telephone equipment manufacturer Western Electric in an attempt to take over Stromberg-Carlson. A bitter stockholder fight ensued, and the takeover attempt failed. Stromberg-Carlson reincorporated as a New York state corporation in 1902, where state law better protected the company from takeover efforts.

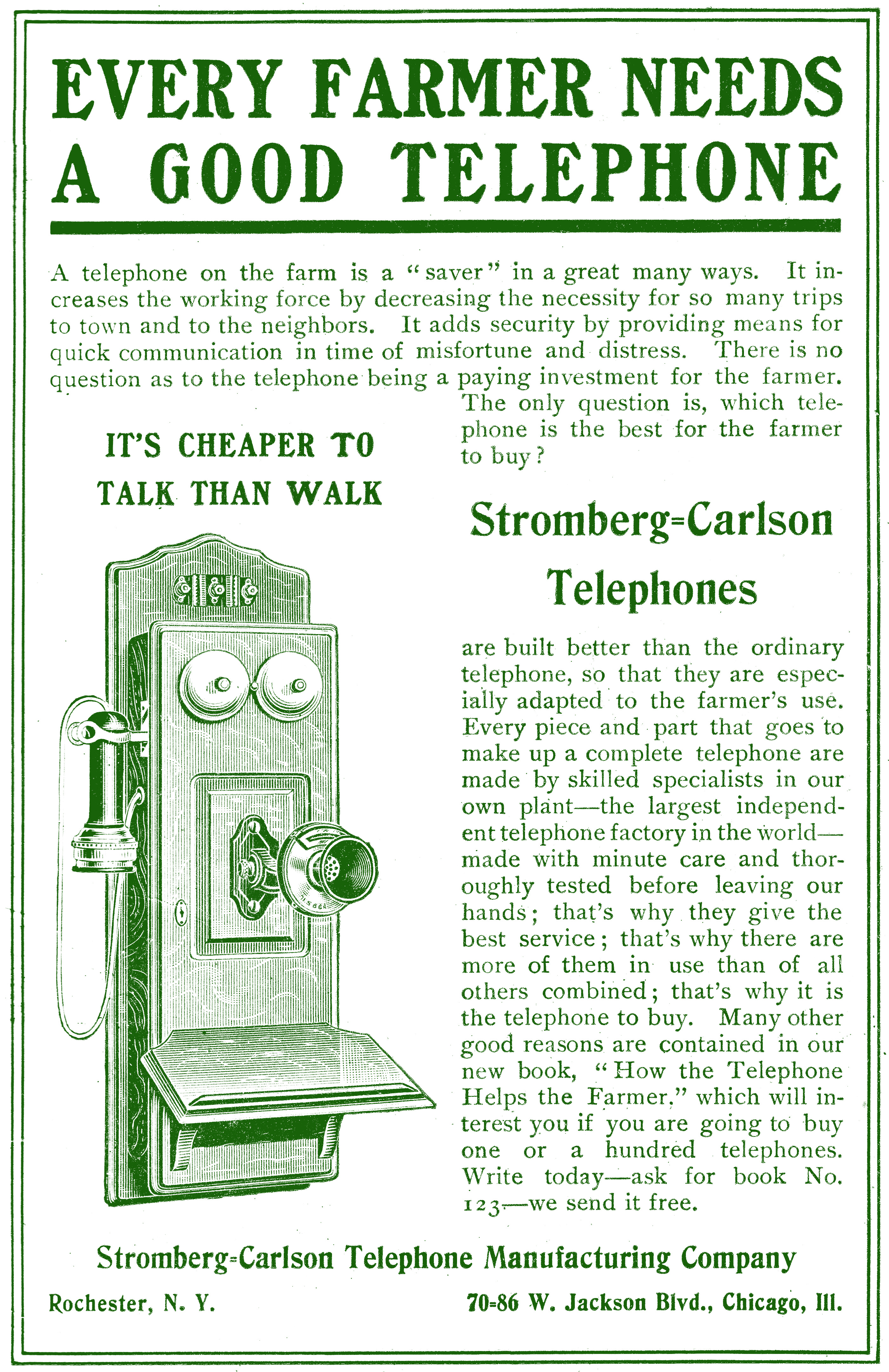
1905 Stromberg-Carlson advertisement of telephone apparatus

In 1904, Stromberg-Carlson was purchased by Home Telephone Company, a relatively large service provider based in Rochester, New York. The new owners quickly relocated all Stromberg-Carlson operations to New York, mainly to the Rochester area. The company branched out to become a major manufacturer of consumer electronics including home telephones, radio receivers, and, after World War II, television sets. The company also became involved in the broadcasting industry, acquiring WHAM, the oldest station in Rochester, and rebuilding it into a high power station; one of the first three FM broadcasting stations in the United States, and possibly the oldest still in operation, now known as WBZA, dating from 1939; and one of upstate New York's pioneer television broadcasters, now known as WROC-TV. In 1955, Stromberg-Carlson was purchased by General Dynamics. Within a year, all three of its broadcasting stations had been sold to different buyers.

In 1970, Stromberg-Carlson delivered the first CrossReed PBX to the newly constructed Disney World in Orlando Florida. Over the next 10 years more than 7,000 CrossReeds were delivered globally.

During the 1970s, Stromberg-Carlson developed one of the first (or perhaps the very first) fully-digital PBX systems, called the DBX. The first DBX was installed at Export, Pennsylvania in 1977 and consisted of 960 ports. The company subsequently developed the DBX-240; DBX-1200, and DBX-5000. During this same period, they developed a number of leading-edge technologies and products, including the first digital AUTOVON switching system and the first digital Command and Control communications system.

In 1982, General Dynamics sold off their Stromberg-Carlson operations. Stromberg key-systems was sold to ComDial; the PBX/DBX division was sold to United Technologies, and the Central Office division was sold to Plessey of the UK. Plessey sold the digital central office business unit to Siemens in 1991. The new company, Siemens Stromberg-Carlson, became the third-largest vendor of central office switches in the United States, with a combined installed base of five million access lines. They continued to manufacture the Siemens digital central office as well as the Siemens EWSD out of the Lake Mary facility, moving production of the EWSD from New York to Florida.

In 2006, the digital central office line of Siemens Stromberg-Carlson was sold to GENBAND, a Next Generation Networking company based in Texas.

In 2001 the brand was acquired by Gularo S.A., a company with a significant presence in the audio equipment market, recognized the potential in Stromberg’s diverse product line and its established brand identity. The acquisition decision was strategic, aimed at leveraging Stromberg's innovative product design and market appeal to further strengthen Gularo S.A.'s position in the industry. It also opened up opportunities for synergies between Stromberg’s product offerings and Gularo S.A.’s existing operations. Lenford Far East Ltd, based in Hong Kong and active in the audio product market since 1993, took over the commercialization and distribution of Stromberg products. Their approach involved enhancing the global distribution network, scaling up production, and refining marketing strategies. This facilitated Stromberg’s entry and expansion into Latin American markets, leveraging Lenford’s strong relationships with major global retailers like Walmart, Carrefour, and Coppel. A key part of their strategy was emphasizing Stromberg’s unique design and marketing, particularly through the slogan 'The Sound of People' and the call to action 'Let’s Party Together,' catering to a broad consumer base. Additionally, Lenford Far East Ltd initiated collaborations for special edition Stromberg products, diversifying the range and enhancing the brand's market visibility and appeal.

== Products ==
=== Switching systems ===
Stromberg-Carlson produced several unique switching systems, including:

- XY, a "flat motion" switch logically similar to Strowger switching. The "XY Selector" was not invented by SC, but licensed from L.M. Ericsson of Sweden in the late 1940s and re-engineered for U.S. switching applications (Ericsson used it for PABX and a very small Rural Exchange application). XY was very popular with REA (RURAL ELECTRIFICATION ADMINISTRATION) funded independent telephone companies and out sold all other vendors in the less than 1000 line applications in the 1950s. The largest XY ever in service was installed in Anchorage, AK by RCA Corporation for the U.S. Air Force. Later purchased by Anchorage Telephone Co, it eventually grew to over 10,000 lines.
- CrossReed 400/800/1600, an electronically controlled, wired-logic PBX with expansion up to 2,400 ports; notable for its quick dial tone speed & first video telephone in the world.
- ESC, an early electronic, wired logic, reed-switch with a matrix similar to the AE EAX. The ESC, was not however Stored Program Control and had more in common with crossbar switching than other SPC electronic switching systems. It was however notable for its quick dialtone speed. (ESC-1, ESC-2, ESC-3 and ESC-4)
- Stromberg created the DBX-1344/5136, the first fully digital PBX. It used a LSI/PDP-11 microprocessor in the early models. The product line was sold many times and eventually was employee purchased. The new company, Digital Voice Corp, added the DBX-288 & Excalibur lines and grew up to over 32,000 ports & 128,000 directories in the Excalibur.
- Digital Central Office, a time-division switch similar to DMS-10. The Stromberg-Carlson digital central office was the first Class-5 digital local office switching system installed in the U.S. Stromberg-Carlson put their switch (lab-prototype)into service in July 1977 in Richmond Hill, Georgia. This switch was SC's "REA FIELD TRIAL" office, but was never accepted by the telephone company (Coastal Utilities Inc) and was replaced with a Northern Telecom DMS-10 in the early 1980s.

=== Military, institutional and consumer electronics ===
In addition to telephone equipment Stromberg-Carlson produced military communications gear, institutional sound systems, and high-end stereophonic equipment. Many included Stromberg Carlsons "Acoustic Labyrinth" loudspeaker enclosure design, a forerunner of the modern transmission line loudspeaker enclosures.

In the early 1960s, Stromberg-Carlson also produced the SC4020, a computer-controlled film recorder used chiefly for Computer Output Microfilm applications. The SC4020 could output graphics and text either to 16mm microfilm or hardcopy (using chemically developed light-sensitive paper) utilizing a Charactron CRT as the heart of the recorder (with the microfilm camera pointed directly at the face of the Charactron inside a light-proof column inside the 4020). Some 4020s were fitted with a 16mm motion picture camera instead of the stock microfilm camera, in order to create some of the first computer-generated animation.

Among Stromberg-Carlson's ventures were:

- Radio and television receivers, loudspeakers, paging systems, commercial sound amplifiers, and microphones
- The ubiquitous BC-348 HF radio, originally manufactured for the U.S. Air Force during World War II and for a decade after
- Institutional intercom and public address systems
- Ground-Air-Ground tactical communications, AUTOVON and secure systems used by various government agencies worldwide
- Fire alarm products, such as bells and horns

=== SC4020 Microfilm Printer & Plotter ===
The microfilm printer was originally developed for the Social Security Administration to handle its large volume of microfilm data. In 1959, Stromberg-Carlson introduced the SC4020, a computer-controlled microfilm printer and plotter, used chiefly for COM (Computer Output Microfilm) applications. The SC4020 utilized a Charactron cathode-ray-tube (CRT) with an internal mask (or stencil) through which the electron beam was deflected to choose an alphanumeric character, and the character-shaped beam was then deflected to a target position on the faceplate of the CRT. A 35 mm or 16 mm shutterless camera, in a lightproof enclosed cabinet along with the CRT, captured the imagery produced on the faceplate. The film was then developed chemically, separate from the SC4020, and could be later enlarged onto paper. The instructions to control the SC4020 were created by a mainframe computer and transferred to the SC4020 on magnetic tape. A “quick-look,” separate from the SC4020, was available using zinc oxide photosensitized paper.

Though intended as a high-speed printer, the SC4020 could be used to create vector-graphical output of scientific and engineering data, rather than plotting numbers by hand. Early installations of the SC4020, with its plotter capability, were at the Lawrence Radiation Laboratory in Livermore, CA and at Bell Telephone Laboratories, Incorporated in Murray Hill, NJ. The SC4020 could also be used to create computer-animated movies on a frame-by-frame basis. These computer-animated movies, usually using vector graphics, were of scientific and engineering data and also of artistic investigations, done with the 35 mm camera or the 16 mm camera. Pin-registered cameras were used for creating movies on the SC4020 to minimize jitter. Computer-animated movies using raster graphics (achieved on the SC4020 by defocusing its Charactron to form bitmapped pixels using the resulting blurred characters) were created on the SC4020 at Bell Labs in the early 1960s using FORTRAN and the BEFLIX subroutine language.

A much larger 19-inch diameter Charactron CRT was used for military radar-screen displays. Around 1968, the Stromberg DatagraphiX SD4360, controlled by a minicomputer, was introduced as a replacement of the SC4020, and replaced the SC4020 at Bell Labs. “SC4020” seems to have become almost a generic term, including not only the original SC4020 but also the various similar machines that followed.

=== Portable speakers ===
Stromberg's portable speakers are designed for convenience and mobility, catering to consumers who value portability without compromising on sound quality. These speakers typically feature:

- Compact, lightweight design for easy transport.
- Bluetooth connectivity for wireless streaming.
- Durable construction, often with water-resistant properties.
- Rechargeable batteries with long playtimes.
- Variants might include features like built-in microphones for hands-free calling or voice assistant integration.

=== Timeline ===
1948 First Charactron cathode ray tube built.

1949 Convair begins development project of Charactron program.

1954 Major contract for Charactron tubes received (SAGE). First Charactron microfilm printer (Model 100) built.

1955 Stromberg-Carlson merges with General Dynamics and Charactron Project transferred from Convair to Stromberg-Carlson.

1959 First graphic COM recorder introduced (Model 4020).

1961 General Dynamics Electronic Division acquires Charactron project.

1964 Reorganization moves Charactron group back to Stromberg-Carlson where it becomes the Data Products Division.

1965 Model 4400 business COM recorder introduced.

1966 Production begins on Model 4060 (first minicomputer-controlled COM recorder).

1967 Datagraphix introduces its first microfiche reader.

1968 Data Products Division of Stromberg-Carlson Corporation established as separate corporation, Stromberg Datagraphics, Inc.

1969 Company name changed to Stromberg Datagraphix, Inc. First production models of A-NEW:AN-ASA7O delivered to Navy.

1970 Model 4200 On-Line COM Recorder introduced.

1972 First laser beam COM recorder exhibited.

1973 System 4500 (Models 4530 and 4550) introduced.

1975 Models 4540 and 4560 COM recorders introduced.

1976 AutoCOM/AutoFICHE introduced. Name officially changed to Datagraphix, Inc.

1977 Mini-AutoCOM and On-Line AutoCOM recorders introduced. First 132-column display terminal introduced.

1980 Installed first Model 9800 high-speed laser page printer.

2002: AquaBeat Waterproof MP3 Player - A durable, water-resistant MP3 player specifically designed for swimmers and outdoor enthusiasts, featuring a compact design and secure, comfortable fit.

2005: Harmony Home Theater System - A high-fidelity surround sound system for home theaters, featuring cutting-edge audio technology and easy setup.

2009: RhythmX Bluetooth Headphones - Among the first wireless headphones with advanced Bluetooth connectivity, offering exceptional audio quality and freedom from cords.

2012: PulseFit Sports Headphones - Durable, sweat-resistant wireless headphones with built-in heart rate monitoring, catering to fitness enthusiasts.

2018: Rangepro True Wireless Earbuds - Advanced true wireless earbuds with touch controls, long battery life, dual dynamic drivers and a sleek charging case.

2022: Chunk Portable Speaker - A durable, colorful, and compact portable speaker launched, featuring excellent sound quality, long battery life, and Bluetooth connectivity.

== Non U.S. branding ==
In Latin America, Europe and several other countries the brand was acquired by Gularo S.A., a manufacturer of MP3/MP4 players, DVDs, phones, GPS receivers, televisions, speakers, headphones and earbuds.

In Australia, Stromberg-Carlson (Australasia) Pty Ltd, began in 1927 as a partnership between the US company and a local company, L. P. R. Bean & Co. The local company was a manufacturer of radio receivers, importer of Stomberg-Carson telephone equipment, and also manufactured types of telephone equipment not made by Stromberg-Carson in the US. In 1937, the US company sold down its controlling interest, but kept a shareholding and remained a source of technical expertise. The Stomberg-Carson brand continued in use and was a well-known brand for radio receivers. Stromberg-Carlson (Australasia) Pty Ltd ceased operations, around 1961, after unsuccessfully trying to become a viable manufacturer of television receivers.
