= Acoustic waveguide =

Physical structure for guiding sound waves

An acoustic waveguide is a physical structure for guiding sound waves, i.e., a waveguide used in acoustics.

== Examples ==
One example is a speaking tube used aboard ships for communication between decks.

Other examples include the rear passage in a transmission-line loudspeaker enclosure, the ear canal, and a stethoscope. The term also applies to guided waves in solids.

A duct for sound propagation also behaves like a transmission line (e.g. air conditioning duct, car muffler, etc.). The duct contains some medium, such as air, that supports sound propagation. Its length is typically around a quarter of the wavelength which is intended to be guided, but the dimensions of its cross section are smaller than this. Sound is introduced at one end of the tube by forcing the pressure to vary in the direction of propagation, which causes a pressure gradient to travel perpendicular to the cross section at the speed of sound. When the wave reaches the end of the transmission line, its behaviour depends on what is present at the end of the line. There are three generalized scenarios:

A low impedance load (e.g. leaving the end open in free air) will cause a reflected wave in which the sign of the pressure variation reverses, but the direction of the pressure wave remains the same.

A load that matches the characteristic impedance (defined below) will completely absorb the wave and the energy associated with it. No reflection will occur.

A high impedance load (e.g. by plugging the end of the line) will cause a reflected wave in which the direction of the pressure wave is reversed but the sign of the pressure remains the same.

Since a transmission line behaves like a four terminal model, one cannot really define or measure the impedance of a transmission line component. One can however measure its input impedance or output impedance. It depends on the cross-sectional area and length of the line, the sound frequency, as well as the characteristic impedance of the sound propagating medium within the duct. Only in the exceptional case of a closed end tube (to be compared with electrical short circuit), the input impedance could be regarded as a component impedance.

Where a transmission line of finite length is mismatched at both ends, there is the potential for a wave to bounce back and forth many times until it is absorbed. This phenomenon is a kind of resonance and will tend to attenuate any signal fed into the line.

When this resonance effect is combined with some sort of active feedback mechanism and power input, it is possible to set up an oscillation which can be used to generate periodic acoustic signals such as musical notes (e.g. in an organ pipe).

The application of transmission line theory is however seldom used in acoustics. An equivalent four terminal model which splits the downstream and upstream waves is used. This eases the introduction of physically measurable acoustic characteristics, reflection coefficients, material constants of insulation material, the influence of air velocity on wavelength (Mach number), etc. This approach also circumvents impractical theoretical concepts, such as acoustic impedance of a tube, which is not measurable because of its inherent interaction with the sound source and the load of the acoustic component.

== See also ==
- Acoustic transmission line - a type of technology used in some loudspeakers, and based on the principles of an acoustic waveguide.

== Bibliography ==
- Morse, P.M., Vibration and sound, McGraw Hill, 1948, NYC, NY.
- Pierce, A.D., Acoustics: An Introduction to its Physical Principles and Applications, McGraw Hill, 1981, NYC, NY.
