= Passive radiator (speaker) =

Type of speaker system

Passive radiator enclosure with front mounted passive radiator; back or side mounting is also used.

A speaker enclosure using a passive radiator usually contains an active loudspeaker (or main driver), and a passive radiator (also known as a "drone cone"). The active loudspeaker is a normal driver, and the passive radiator is of similar construction, but without a voice coil and magnet assembly. It is not attached to a voice coil or wired to an electrical circuit or power amplifier. Small, Benson, Bullock, and Hurlburt have published the results of research into the analysis and design of passive-radiator loudspeaker systems. The passive-radiator principle was identified as being particularly useful in compact systems where vent realization is difficult, impossible, or undesirable such as for waterproofing, but it can also be applied satisfactorily to larger systems, including subwoofers.

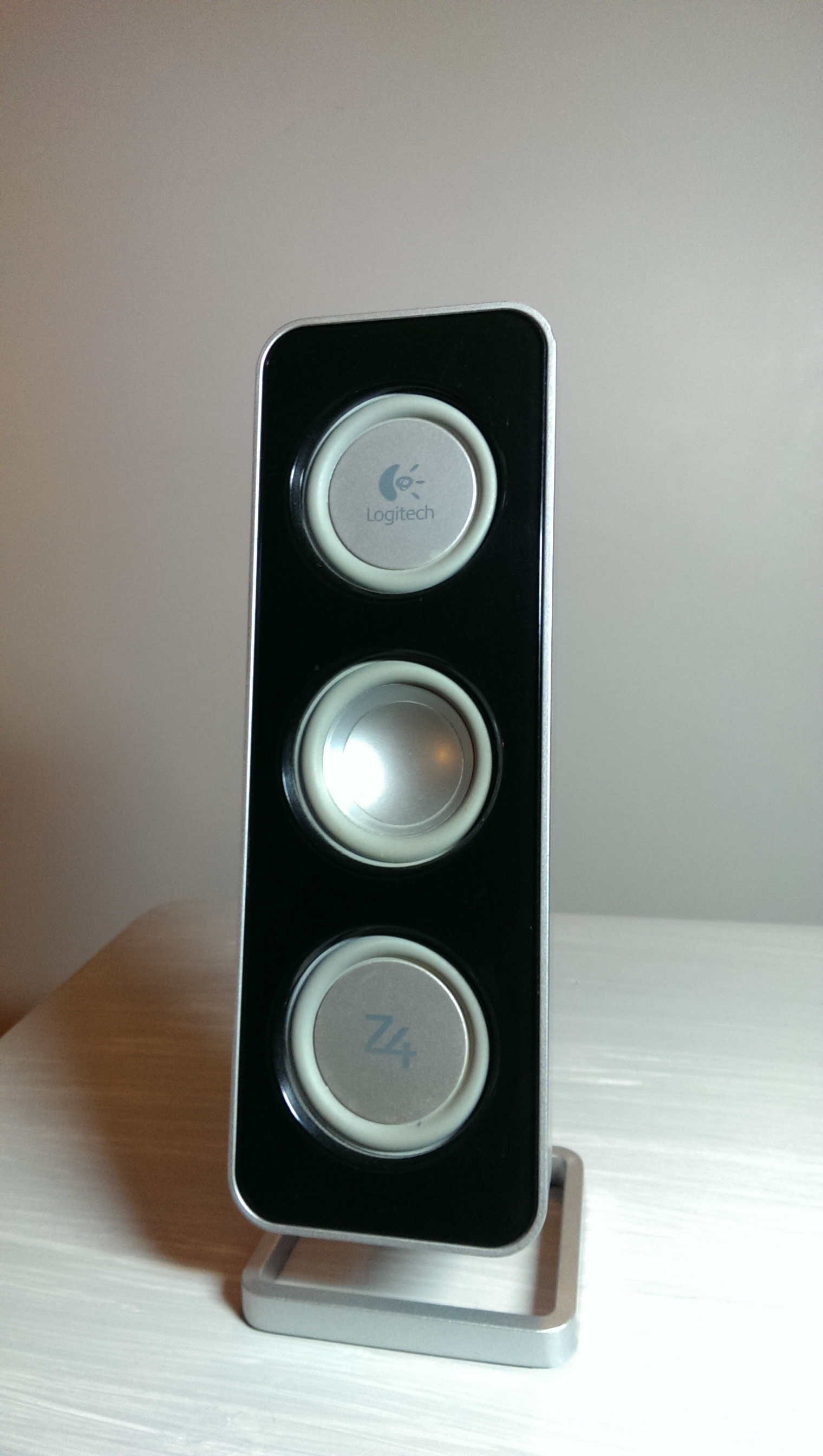
A small computer speaker cabinet. The middle speaker is a real loudspeaker. The top and bottom cones are passive radiators.

In the same way as a ported loudspeaker, a passive radiator system uses the sound pressure otherwise trapped in the enclosure to excite a resonance that makes it easier for the speaker system to create the deepest pitches (e.g., basslines). The passive radiator resonates at a frequency determined by its mass and the stiffness (compliance) of the air in the enclosure. It is tuned to the specific enclosure by varying its mass (e.g., by adding mass to the cone). Internal air pressure produced by movements of the active driver cone moves the passive radiator cone. This resonance simultaneously reduces the amount that the woofer has to move.

== Design considerations ==
Passive radiators are used instead of a reflex port for several reasons. In small-volume ported enclosures tuned to low frequencies, the length of the required port becomes very large, and may not be feasible. In such cases, a passive radiator can be used to extend the bass response beyond what would be possible for a ported enclosure. They are also used to reduce or eliminate the objectionable noises of port turbulence and compressible flow caused by high-velocity airflow in small ports. In addition, ports have pipe resonances that can produce undesirable effects on the frequency response. To a first-order approximation, the passive radiator works identically to a port.

Passive radiators are tuned by varying their moving mass (M_{mp}), changing the way that they interact with the compliance of the air in the box. The total moving mass of the cone of the passive radiator should be approximately equivalent to the mass of the air that would have filled the port that might have been used for that design. If the passive radiator's total moving mass including air load equals that of the port, and the passive radiator's compliance is very high, then the frequency response behavior of these two types of systems will be virtually identical.

Although the frequency response of a passive radiator low-frequency system will be similar to that of a ported cabinet, the system low-frequency roll-off will be slightly steeper (5th-order rather than 4th-order), due to a notch (dip) in the frequency response caused by the V_{ap} (compliance or stiffness) of the passive radiator. This notch occurs at the passive radiator's free-air resonance frequency, and the resulting system transfer function causes slightly poorer transient response. Despite this, perhaps due to the lack of vent turbulence and vent pipe resonances, some listeners prefer the sound of passive radiators to reflex ports. Passive radiator speakers are only slightly more complex to design but are generally more expensive as compared to standard ported enclosures.

== Applications ==
Passive radiators are used in Bluetooth speakers, compact stereo speakers, subwoofer cabinets and car audio speaker systems, particularly in cases where there is not enough space for a port or vent system. While most studio monitor speakers are either ported bass reflex designs, or closed-box enclosures without a vent or passive radiator, Mackie's HR824 and HR624 monitor speakers have a passive radiator installed on the rear of the cabinet. Focal also sells a studio monitor with a passive radiator called the SM9. Adam Audio produces the D3V desktop studio monitors with passive radiators, as do Eve Audio with their EXO line. Respective examples of a smart speaker and a portable Bluetooth Speaker utilizing passive radiators are Apple's HomePod mini and Ultimate Ears' UE Boom.

== See also ==
- Loudspeaker enclosure
- Bass reflex – a type of loudspeaker enclosure that uses a port (hole) or vent cut into the cabinet and a section of tubing or pipe affixed to the port
- Acoustic suspension – a method of loudspeaker cabinet design and utilisation that uses one or more loudspeaker drivers mounted in a sealed box or cabinet
