= Megasound =

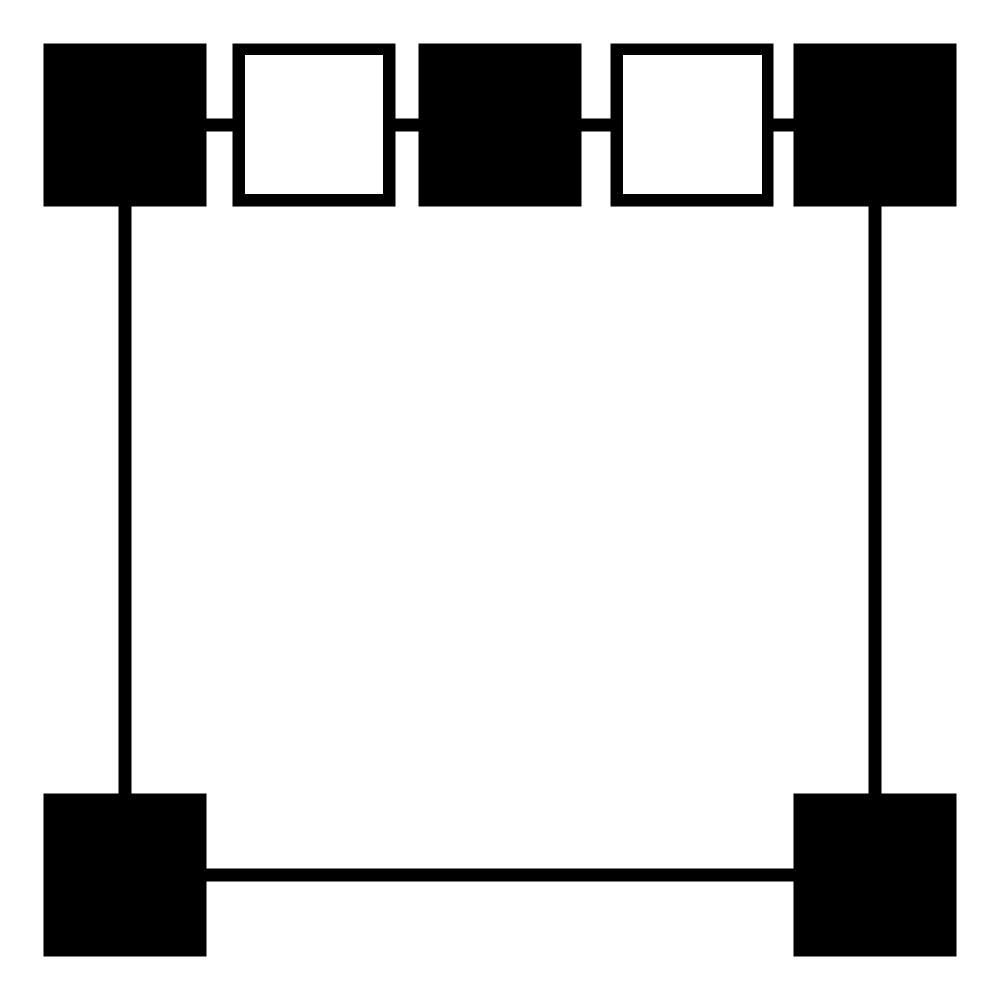
Megasound speaker layout, showing the extra speakers in white

Megasound was the name of a movie theater sound system created by Warner Bros. and was officially deployed during the early 1980s. Warner Bros. used it to provide deep-bass enhancement to premiere engagements for a handful of their features, including:

- Altered States (1980)
- Outland (1981)
- Superman II (1981)
- Wolfen (1981)

Theaters equipped for Megasound had an additional battery of speakers, consisting subs and horns; usually all were placed on the stage, behind the screen. This system also came along with extra power-amps and specialized processing equipment. Megasound selected soundtrack events with much low-frequency content (thuds, crashes, explosions, etc.) were directed to these speakers at very high-volume, creating a visceral-effect intended to thrill the audience. Megasound has been best remembered for its infrasonic rumble capability.

Megasound was similar to MCA/Universal's Sensurround. However, unlike Sensurround, Warner Bros. never attempted to market Megasound to other studios as a high-fidelity, high-impact bass enhancement sound system.

== History ==
In 1977, Dolby debuted the 70mm "Baby Boom" format and used the same 70mm format as Todd-AO with a reconfiguration of its original six-track sound. The new setup utilized speakers left over from old 70mm Todd-AO engagements. There were three screen channels, one surround channel and two dedicated boom channels that utilized frequencies > 250 Hz. Encoding Dolby A-type NR (Noise Reduction) on prints meant that each of the six magnetic tracks had less tape hiss.

Warner Bros. Superman (1978) was the first film to use the 70mm "Split Surround" as a beta-test project. The surround was split into left and right. The left/right high frequencies were recorded left-center/right-center, while sharing these tracks with the booms, which were recorded at lower frequencies. Lower frequencies for the stereo surrounds were recorded on track 6, the former mono surround track. A new filter then split the boom tracks on channels 2 and 4 from the stereo treble surround tracks. The surrounds were limited > 450 Hz and the booms < 250 Hz. Some Megasound installations added additional speakers; one which a near-future Megasound driven array of subs and horns could possibly fill.

Apocalypse Now (1979) was the first film to officially make use of this new 70mm Split Surround. And required theaters that had 70mm Dolby capability to purchase a then-estimated $4,000 upgrade to their Dolby CP-100 Sound Processors. The upgrade involved replacing their existing Surround Adapter with the newly developed Dolby SA-5. Once the Dolby CP-200 Sound Processor was released, the upgrade to stereo surround was reduced to $1425 as of March 1, 1990. This new adapter did the splitting and filtering of the new surround track configuration. Today, a similar type of configuration is known as Dolby 5.1 Surround. Warner Bros. Megasound was developed to be the bass extension to this then new 70mm Split Surround system.

== 70mm Split Surround ==
Encoding Map

Tracks	Channels	Type
1L	L	Left
2Le	(> 450 Hz) for Ls + (< 250 Hz) for LFE	Left Surround/Boom (.1)
3C	C	Center
4Re	(> 450 Hz) for Rs + (< 250 Hz) for LFE	Right Surround/Boom (.1)
5R	R	Right
6S	(< 450 Hz) for Ls + (< 450 Hz) for Rs	Mono Surround

Decoding Map

Channels	Track	Speaker
L	1L	Stage-Left
C	3C	Stage-Center
R	5R	Stage-Right
Ls (P)	(> 450 Hz) from Le + (< 450 Hz) from 6S	Left-Side/Rear
Rs (Q)	(> 450 Hz) from Re + (< 450 Hz) from 6S	Right-Side/Rear
LFE	(< 250 Hz) from 2Le + (< 250 Hz) from 4Re	Stage L & R Mid-Centers

Megasound made its addition to this system by way of subharmonic synthesis using a customized and pre-configured rack-mount processor. Also additional BGW or Cerwin-Vega power-amps and Universal-style Cerwin-Vega E horns or the later Cerwin-Vega L36 JE folded horns as the speaker-array were used. The extra power and speakers in some installations were left over from MCA/Universal's previous Sensurround presentations. The Altec A4 could also be used as a speaker alternative. The concept to some degree was to build on what was already available in many 70mm theaters. However, limited to only those that went over to using the SA-5 or could upgrade to the later Dolby CP-200 released in May 1980 (which had the SA-5 capabilities built-in) and was willing to spend even more on a bass enhancement.

70mm Six-Track Dolby A-type NR magnetic prints were used for Megasound. The processor synthesized (using compression and digital delay) the harmonics of the incoming boom tracks' low-frequency signals (from the LFE) to create incredible deep-bass using a relatively small array of subs and horns. Also with lesser risk of overloading amps or damaging these smaller speakers. The Megasound processing algorithms were triggered by low-frequency bass below 40 Hz from a DBX-type Megasound encoded soundtrack. The bass generation synthesis had a custom cut-off fail-safe @ 16 Hz to prevent risk of structural damage to the presentation venue.

Megasound processing was provided by subharmonic processors such as the Eventide Clockwork Inc. Harmonizer or the Aphex Systems Aural Exciter. These units were specially modified to work in the infrasonic range and bore the Megasound logo on their casing. Since Megasound was capable of operating into the infrasonic range with a max-low of 16 Hz @ 120db; its bass extension was really unlike or incomparable with any modern sound system. Megasound presentations literally forced the audience to feel physical sensations by way of the soundtrack. And in-turn, this could have also a slightly more intense psychological-effect on them as well; to what degree, was dependent on what was being depicted on the screen. "Presented In Megasound: A Revolutionary New Concept In The Sensation Of Sound" was the tagline Warner Bros. used for their Megasound engagements in local advertisements.

== Unofficial presentations ==
- Megasound was allegedly tested on select audiences using the 1979 re-release of The Exorcist 70mm six-track Dolby Stereo conversion.
- Megasound had also been advertised with 1982 premiere engagements of Blade Runner in Seattle at the Cinerama.
