= Sound 360 =

Motion picture sound system

Sound 360 left, center, right and surround channel speaker placement layout

Sound 360 was the name of a motion picture sound system used by 20th Century-Fox to enhance the premiere engagements of their 1977 feature Damnation Alley.

The format employed the standard 35mm magnetic stereo soundtracks (left, center, right and surround) in a unique configuration. The center channel was directed to the usual behind-the-screen loudspeaker. The left and right channels were redirected to a pair of large full-range speakers mounted on either side of the auditorium. The surround channel was reproduced by a single full-range speaker mounted in the back. The general effect was more enveloping (and often much louder) than a standard 35mm stereo presentation, and very similar to the Megasound process unveiled a few years later by Warner Bros. for the film Altered States. In addition to Damnation Alley, the film Damien: Omen II was also released in the Sound 360 process.

== See also ==
- Sensurround
- Megasound
