= Live sound mixing =

Blending of multiple sound sources for a live event

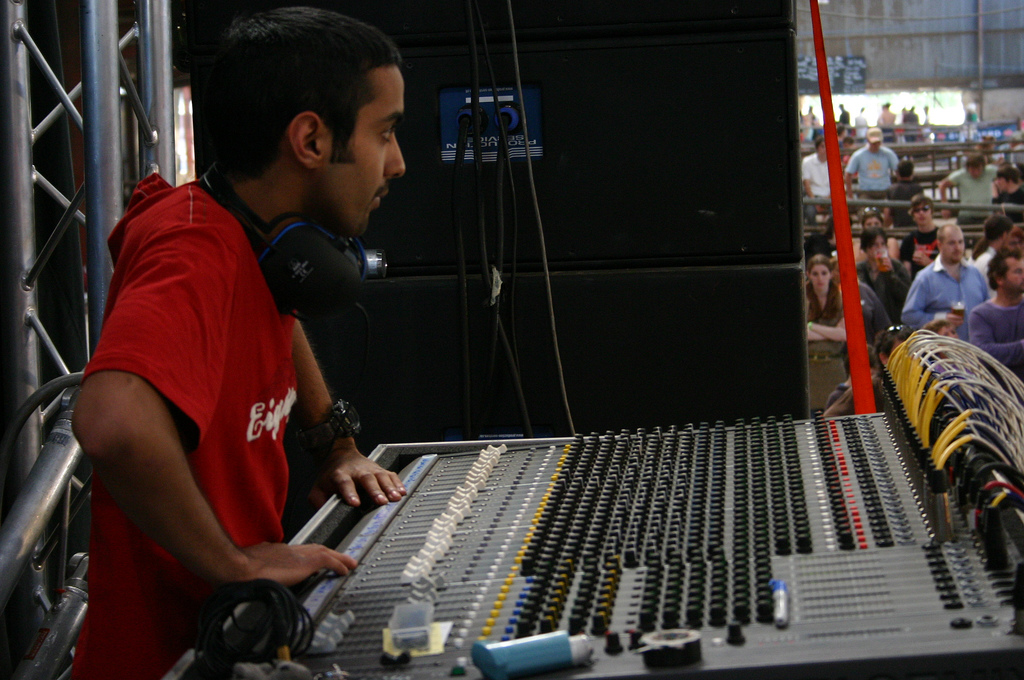
A monitor engineer and console at an outdoor event

Live sound mixing is the blending of multiple sound sources by an audio engineer using a mixing console or software. Sounds that are mixed include those from instruments and voices which are picked up by microphones (for drum kit, lead vocals and acoustic instruments like piano or saxophone and pickups for instruments such as electric bass) and pre-recorded material, such as songs on CD or a digital audio player. Individual sources are typically equalised to adjust the bass and treble response and routed to effect processors to ultimately be amplified and reproduced via a loudspeaker system. The live sound engineer listens and balances the various audio sources in a way that best suits the needs of the event.

== Equipment ==
Audio equipment is usually connected together in a sequence known as the signal chain. In live sound situations, this consists of input transducers like microphones, pickups, and DI boxes. These devices are connected, often via multicore cable, to individual channels of a mixing console. Each channel on a mixing console typically has a vertical "channel strip", which is a column of knobs and buttons which are used to adjust the level and the bass, middle register and treble of the signal. The audio console also typically allows the engineer to add effects units to each channel (addition of reverb, etc.) before they are electrically summed (blended together). A live audio sound mixer basically mixes a bunch of different signals together and then sends that blended signal to outputs (speakers).

EQ mixing involved adjusting each sound source's equalization (EQ) settings to achieve a desired sound. This involves adjusting the frequency, amplitude, and resonance of each sound source. EQ can be used to create clarity and depth to the mix, as well as to customize the sound of each instrument or voice.

Audio signal processing may be applied to (inserted on) individual inputs, groups of inputs, or the entire output mix, using processors that are internal to the mixer or external (outboard effects, which are often mounted in 19" racks). An example of an inserted effect on an individual input is patching in an Autotune rackmount unit onto the lead vocalist's track to correct pitch errors. An example of using an inserted effect on a group of inputs would be to add reverb to all of the vocalists' channels (lead vocalist and backing vocalists). An example of adding effects to the entire output mix would be to use a graphic equalizer to adjust the frequency response of the entire mix.

== Types ==
=== Front of house mixing ===
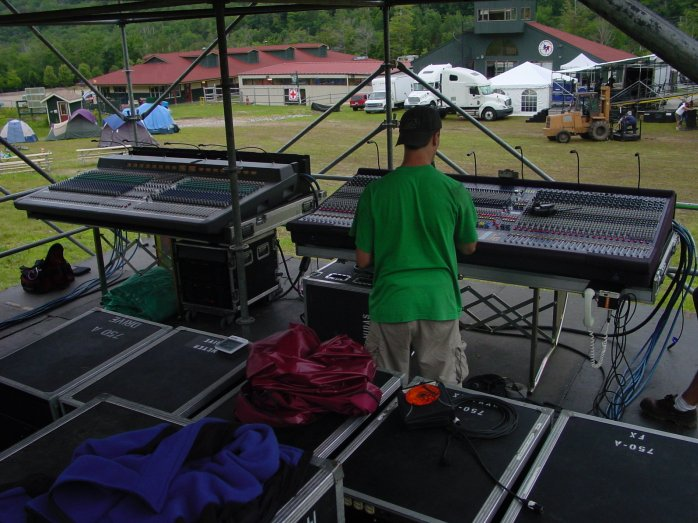
Two FOH consoles at an outdoor event.

The front of house (FOH) engineer focuses on mixing audio for the audience, and most often operates from the middle of the audience or at the last few rows of the audience. The output signals from the FOH console connects to a Sound reinforcement system. Other non-audio crew members, such as the lighting console operator, might also work from the FOH position, since they need to be able to see the show from the audience's perspective.

=== Foldback ===
The foldback or monitor engineer focuses on mixing the sound that the performers hear on stage via a stage monitor system (also known as the foldback system). The monitor engineer's role is important where the instruments and voices on the stage area is amplified. Usually, individual performers receive personalised feeds either via monitors placed on the stage floor in front of them or via in-ear monitors. The monitor engineer's console is usually placed in the wings just off-stage, to provide easier communication between the performers and the monitor engineer.

For smaller shows, such as bar and smaller club gigs, it is common for the monitors to be mixed from the front of house position, and the number of individual monitor mixes could be limited by the capabilities of the front of house mixing desk. In smaller clubs with lower- to mid-priced audio consoles, the audio engineer may only have a single "auxiliary send" knob on each channel strip. With only one "aux send", an engineer would only be able to make a single monitor mix, which would normally be focused on meeting the needs of the lead singer. Larger, more expensive audio consoles may provide the capabilities to make multiple monitor mixes (e.g., one mix for the lead singer, a second mix for the backing vocalist, and a third for the rhythm section musicians). In a noisy club with high-volume rock music groups, monitor engineers may be asked for just the vocals in the monitors. This is because in a rock band, the guitarist, bassist and keyboardist typically have their own large amplifiers and speakers, and rock drums are loud enough to be heard acoustically. In large venues, such as outdoor festivals, bands may request a mix of the full band through the monitors, including vocals and instruments.

Drummers generally want a blend of all of the onstage instruments and vocals in their monitor mix, with extra volume provided for bass drum, electric bass and guitar. Guitar players typically want to hear the bass drum, other guitars (e.g., rhythm guitar) and the vocals. Bass players typically ask for a good volume of bass drum along with the guitars. Vocalists typically want to hear their own vocals. Vocalists may request other instruments in their monitor mix, as well.

=== Broadcast ===
The broadcast mixer is responsible for audio delivered for radio or television broadcast. Broadcast mixing is usually performed in an OB van parked outside the venue.

== Sound checks and technical rehearsals ==
For small events, often a soundcheck is conducted a few hours before the show. The instruments (drum kit, electric bass and bass amplifier, etc.) are set up on stage, and the engineer places microphones near the instruments and amplifiers in the most appropriate location to pick up the sound and some instruments, such as the electric bass, are connected to the audio console via a DI box. Once all the instruments are set up, the engineer asks each instrumentalist to perform alone, so that the levels and equalization for the instruments can be adjusted. Since a drum kit contains a number of drums, cymbals and percussion instruments, the engineer typically adjusts the level and equalization for each mic'd instrument. Once the sound of each individual instrument is set, the engineer asks the band to play a song from their repertoire, so that the levels of one instrument versus another can be adjusted.

Mics are set up for the lead vocalist and backing vocalist and the singers are asked to sing individually and as a group, so that the engineer can adjust the levels and equalization. The final part of the soundcheck is to have the rhythm section and all the vocalists perform a song from their repertoire. During this song, the engineer can adjust the balance of the different instruments and vocalists. This allows the sound of the instruments and vocals to be fine-tuned prior to the audience hearing the first song.

In the 2010s, many professional bands and major venues use digital mixing consoles that have automated controls and digital memory for previous settings. The settings of previous shows can be saved and recalled in the console and a band can start playing with a limited soundcheck. Automated mixing consoles are a great time saver for concerts where the main band is preceded by several support acts. Using an automated console, the engineer can record the settings that each band asks for during their individual soundchecks. Then, during the concert, the engineer can call up the settings from memory, and the faders will automatically move to the position that they were placed in during the soundcheck. On a larger scale, technical rehearsals may be held in the days or weeks leading up to a concert. These rehearsals are used to fine-tune the many technical aspects (such as lighting, sound, video) associated with a live performance.

== Training and background ==
Audio engineers must have extensive knowledge of audio engineering to produce a good mix, because they have to understand how to mix different instruments and amplifiers, what types of mics to use, where to place the mics, how to attenuate "hot" instrument signals that are overloading and clipping the channel, how to prevent audio feedback, how to set the audio compression for different instruments and vocals, and how to prevent unwanted distortion of the vocal sound. However, to be a professional live sound engineer, an individual needs more than just technical knowledge. They must also understand the types of sounds and tones that various musical acts in different genres expect in their live sound mix. This knowledge of musical styles is typically learned from years of experience listening to and mixing sound in live contexts. A live sound engineer must know, for example, the difference between creating the powerful drum sound that a heavy metal drummer will want for their kit, versus a drummer from a Beatles tribute band. They should also be able to troubleshoot technical issues quickly and effectively, and be comfortable working with a variety of different systems and setups.

According to professionals, it is important to have both technical and creative skills. Technical skills involve understanding the principles of sound and acoustics, as well as being familiar with different types of audio equipment. This means understanding how to use equalization, compression, and reverb to create the desired sound.

== See also ==
- Live event support
- Power alley
- Public address
