= Sensurround =

Experimental sound system

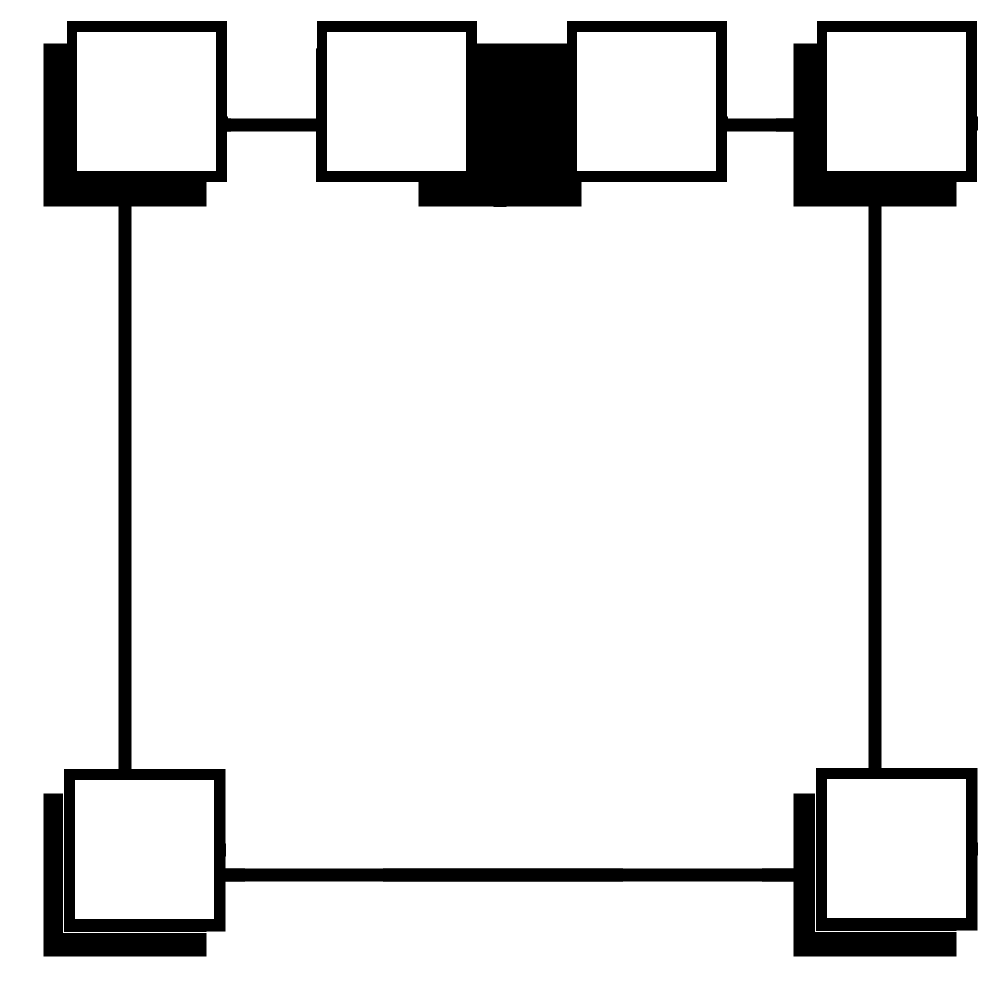
Sensurround speaker diagram, with the extra speakers shown in white (four behind the screen and two at the back of the theatre).

Sensurround logo (designed for the release of the film Earthquake).

Sensurround is the brand name for a process created by MCA and developed by Cerwin-Vega in conjunction with Universal Studios to enhance the audio experience during film screenings, specifically for the 1974 film Earthquake. The process was intended for subsequent use and was adopted for five more films, Midway (1976), Rollercoaster (1977), the theatrical version of Saga of a Star World (1978), the Battlestar Galactica pilot, as well as the compilation film Mission Galactica: The Cylon Attack (1979) and Zoot Suit (1981). Sensurround worked by adding extended-range bass for sound effects, reproduced by six large speakers, four behind the screen and two at the back of the theatre. The low-frequency sounds were more felt than heard, providing a vivid complement to onscreen depictions of earth tremors, bomber formations, and amusement park rides. The overall trend toward "multiplex" cinema structures presented challenges that made Sensurround impractical as a permanent feature of cinema.

Sensurround helped bring wider recognition to established loudspeaker manufacturer Cerwin-Vega, and aided in establishing a strong reputation for new audio amplifier company BGW Systems. The increased awareness of extended low-frequency sound reproduction that Sensurround brought to film audiences was a factor in the increase in subwoofer sales and in the rise in the number of subwoofer designs in the late 1970s and 1980s.

== Development ==
=== Original design ===
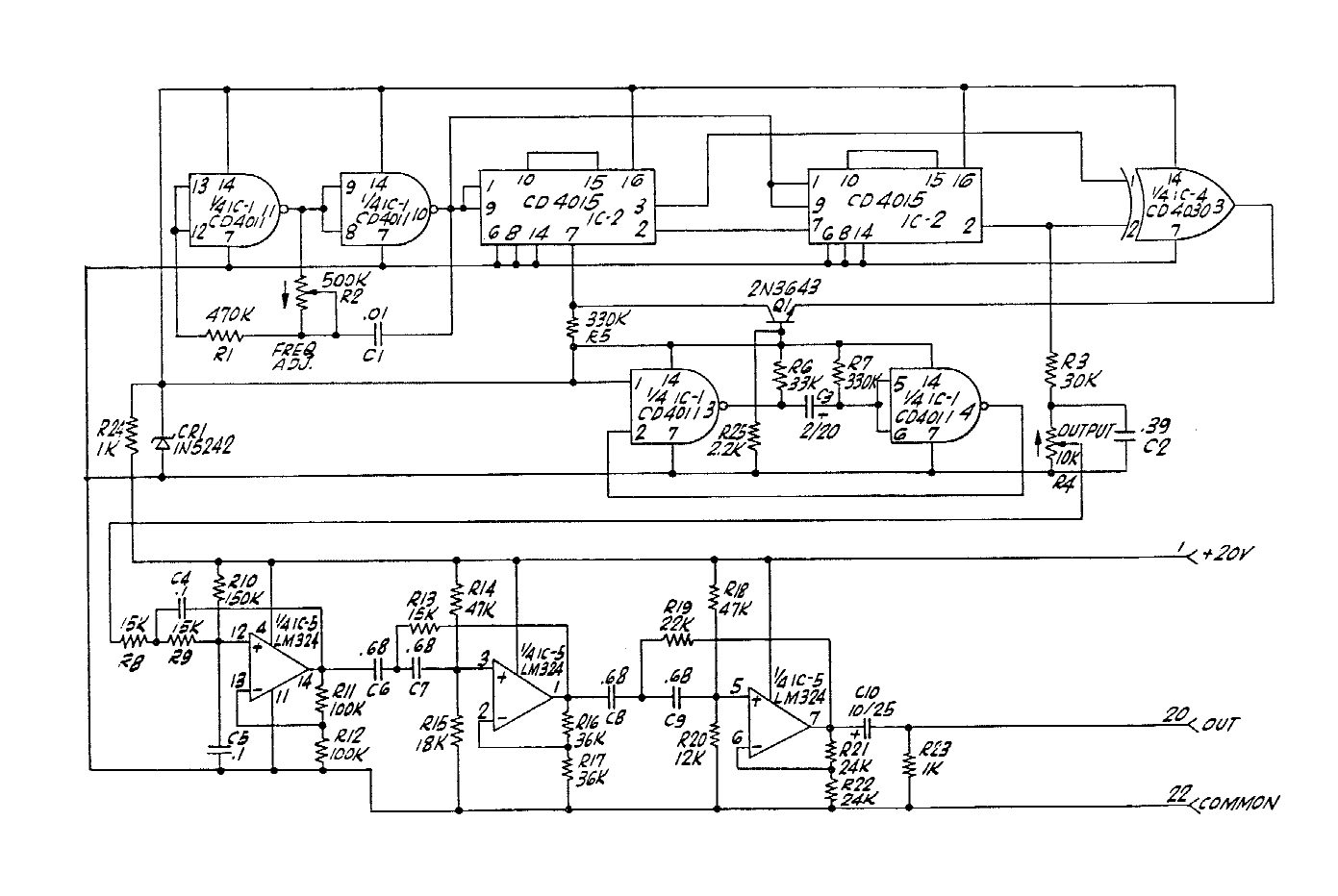
Sensurround pseudorandom number generator circuit on the patent, to create low frequency rumble.

The original Sensurround design used for Earthquake employed a pseudorandom noise generator, designed by D. Broadus "Don" Keele, Jr., to create the low-frequency rumble, using recordings of the 1971 Sylmar earthquake as a reference. Two low frequency control tones (25 and 35Hz) were printed on the film's mono optical or magnetic track; from the projector, the tones entered a control box in the projection booth, which fed low frequency pseudorandom noise to 1,600 watt BGW 750 audio amplifiers driving the speakers. The control box generated a pseudorandom noise signal with energy between 17 and 120 Hz. The control track method was employed because there was no way to accurately record bass lower than 40 Hz on an optical or magnetic film soundtrack at the time. When receiving the noise signal, the amplifier and subwoofers responded with sound pressures ranging from 100 dB to 120 dB. The resulting rumble could be felt by audience members as well as heard.

For the film Earthquake, Sensurround was activated during the quake scenes to augment the conventional soundtrack.

== History ==
=== Awards ===
In 1974, Waldon O. Watson, Richard J. Stumpf, Robert J. Leonard and the Universal City Studios Sound Department received a special Scientific and Engineering Academy Award for "the development and engineering of the Sensurround System for motion picture presentation". The film Earthquake also won an Academy Award for Best Sound (Ronald Pierce, Melvin M. Metcalfe Sr.).

=== Drawbacks ===
Sensurround made Earthquake a popular "event" film in 1974 and one of the year's highest-grossing films. Sensurround presented practical challenges, though, in multiplex cinemas where separate theater spaces shared walls. Audiences for The Godfather Part II, which opened the same month, November 1974, as Earthquake, often complained to theater managers about the Sensurround effect when Earthquake was shown in an adjoining theater. The low-frequency vibrations rattled tiles and plaster, too, leading to damage in some venues; a safety net was installed at Mann's Chinese Theatre in Hollywood to catch errant pieces of plaster falling from the ceiling.

== Cultural references ==
American alternative rock band They Might Be Giants released a song in 1996 titled "Sensurround" that was incorporated in the soundtrack to Mighty Morphin Power Rangers: The Movie and (in a different, faster-paced recording) their EP S-E-X-X-Y. The song makes several references to the innovation, especially as used in Earthquake.

The Sex Pistols' 1977 song Holidays in the Sun references "Sensurround sound."

The Red Hot Chili Peppers 1991 song The Greeting Song references Sensurround in its lyrics.

== See also ==
- Megasound
- Sound 360
- Dolby Stereo
- 5.1 surround sound
- DTS Digital Surround
