= Isobaric loudspeaker =

Configuration for bass speakers in a sound system

An isobaric loudspeaker is a loudspeaker in which two or more identical woofers (bass drivers) operate simultaneously, with a common body of enclosed air adjoining one side of each diaphragm. They are most often used to improve low-end frequency response without increasing cabinet size, though at the expense of cost and weight. Isobaric loudspeakers were first introduced by Harry F. Olson in the early 1950s.

As the name implies, the speaker operates via an isobaric process in which the enclosed air remains at roughly constant pressure, but is forced to move by the paired forces of the two speakers.

== Design principles ==
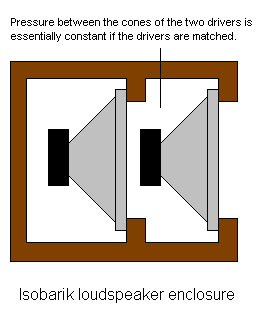
Isobaric loudspeaker in a cone-to-magnet (in-phase) arrangement. The image above shows a sealed enclosure; vented enclosures may also use the isobaric scheme.

Two identical loudspeakers are coupled to work together as one unit: they are mounted one behind the other in a casing to define a sealed chamber of air in between them. The volume of this "isobaric" chamber is usually chosen to be small for reasons of convenience and to better couple the drivers. In a subwoofer, where the mid-range output is not needed, the optimum arrangement is front to front, i.e. the outer cone faces another outer cone and the drivers are wired out of phase. In isobaric designs, the two drivers are placed either "cone to magnet" and wired in phase with one another or "cone to cone" or "magnet to magnet" and wired out of phase with one another so that their cones move together when driven with an audio signal. The term “isobaric” points to the somewhat erroneous notion that the air pressure in the sealed chamber between the loudspeaker is constant (the "isobaric" condition), when in fact there will be small changes due to the differences in the drivers technical parameters and the air that each is pressurising. One driver will be pressurising the air in the listening room, while the other is pressurising a smaller volume of air in the speaker cabinet.

The two drivers operating in tandem exhibit similar behavior as one loudspeaker in twice the cabinet. The cabinet is defined as the space behind the rear driver. The volume of air between the speakers has no acoustic effect on the cabinet space so that the saved space is less than 50%. Other aspects are unchanged like resonant frequency and maximum SPL. The new driver will have the same resonant frequency, Qts, excursion, etc. as one driver with the same applied signal. With optimal out of phase designs, distortion is slightly reduced due to the cancellation of suspension and other driver non-linearities. Because the impedance is also halved, the performance of an isobaric speaker is achieved with twice the power. The new efficiency is thus 3 dB lower than with one loudspeaker. The reason for the unchanged resonance frequency is simple: the new combined loudspeaker has twice the moving mass compared to the single driver but also half the compliance because of the doubled suspension.

The result is that the coupled driver pair (iso-group) can now produce the same frequency response in half the box volume that a single driver of the same type would require. For example, if a speaker is optimized for performance in a 40 liter enclosure, one iso-group of the same speakers can achieve the same low frequency extension and overall response characteristics in a 20 liter enclosure. The aforementioned volumes exclude the isobaric chamber. If the iso group is placed in the original 40 liter, the loading will be incorrect (if the 40 liter was a correct loading of the loudspeaker).

Of course if you double the moving mass of a single driver, halve its compliance and halve its impedance, you would attain identical results. Although this requires the ability to manufacture a custom driver, it has the advantage of saving space and cost because only one driver is needed.

== Distortion ==
Any non-linear behavior of the speakers affects sound pressure within the chamber, and could give rise to distortion components. For in-phase designs ("cone to magnet" and not "magnet to magnet" or "cone-to-cone" designs) this tends to occur because of front-to-back non-symmetrical behavior. These may also occur when the speaker driven to high levels for an extended period of time and the voice coils of the two drivers dissipate vibration and heat at different levels because of differing air circulation (one driver is exposed to the outside air, and one is fully enclosed in a chamber). One patented design attempts to attenuate this distortion by absorptive material between the drivers.
