= Power alley =

Audio term

Power alley is a term used in audio engineering to denote the line between subwoofers where output from each subwoofer is in phase and is noticeably louder.

The effects of separated subwoofers are more predictable outdoors; however, subwoofers are often placed together as a starting point for indoor venues as well.

== Problem ==
Subwoofers placed at each side of the stage will typically cancel unpredictably everywhere in the listening area except along the center line between the speakers.

== Solution ==
Placing subwoofer cabinets together tends to give a smoother response to each member of the audience. Centering the subwoofers between the high-end cabinets tends to minimize the timing error throughout the listening area.
