= Cerwin-Vega =

Audio components manufacturing company

Cerwin-Vega Inc.
- Formerly: Vega Laboratories
- Company type: Private
- Industry: Electronics
- Founded: 1954; 72 years ago
- Founder: Gene Czerwinski
- Headquarters: Los Angeles, California, United States
- Area served: Worldwide
- Products: Loudspeakers, amplifiers, home theaters
- Owner: CVM Acquisition Services
- Website: cerwinvega.com

Cerwin-Vega Inc. is a brand name used on products for professional audio components, as well as home audio speakers, and car audio components. Originally a stand-alone company, Cerwin-Vega was acquired by the Stanton Group after declaring bankruptcy in 2003.

In 2007, Stanton sold off the mobile products division to CVM Acquisition Services (a sister company to Diamond Audio Technologies) LLC.

The brand name of Cerwin-Vega was effectively split for several years across two companies, Cerwin-Vega Mobile which handled products specifically for mobile applications and Stanton Group for all remaining products. Later, the Stanton Group was wholly acquired by Gibson Guitar Company on December 5, 2011, and for some time Gibson managed Cerwin Vega, KRK Systems, and Stanton brands under their Gibson Pro Audio division. Cerwin-Vega sells internationally from two main locations; one in Deerfield Beach, FL, and the other location in Brussels, Belgium, while manufacturing their pro products primarily in Malaysia and home products primarily in China.

After corporate restructuring, Gibson dismantled most of Pro Audio division (only retaining KRK Systems) and sold several parts of it including Cerwin-Vega. Cerwin-Vega was eventually acquired by CVM Acquisition Services in 2020 and with it reunited both mobile and other parts of Cerwin-Vega as Cerwin-Vega Inc.

== History ==
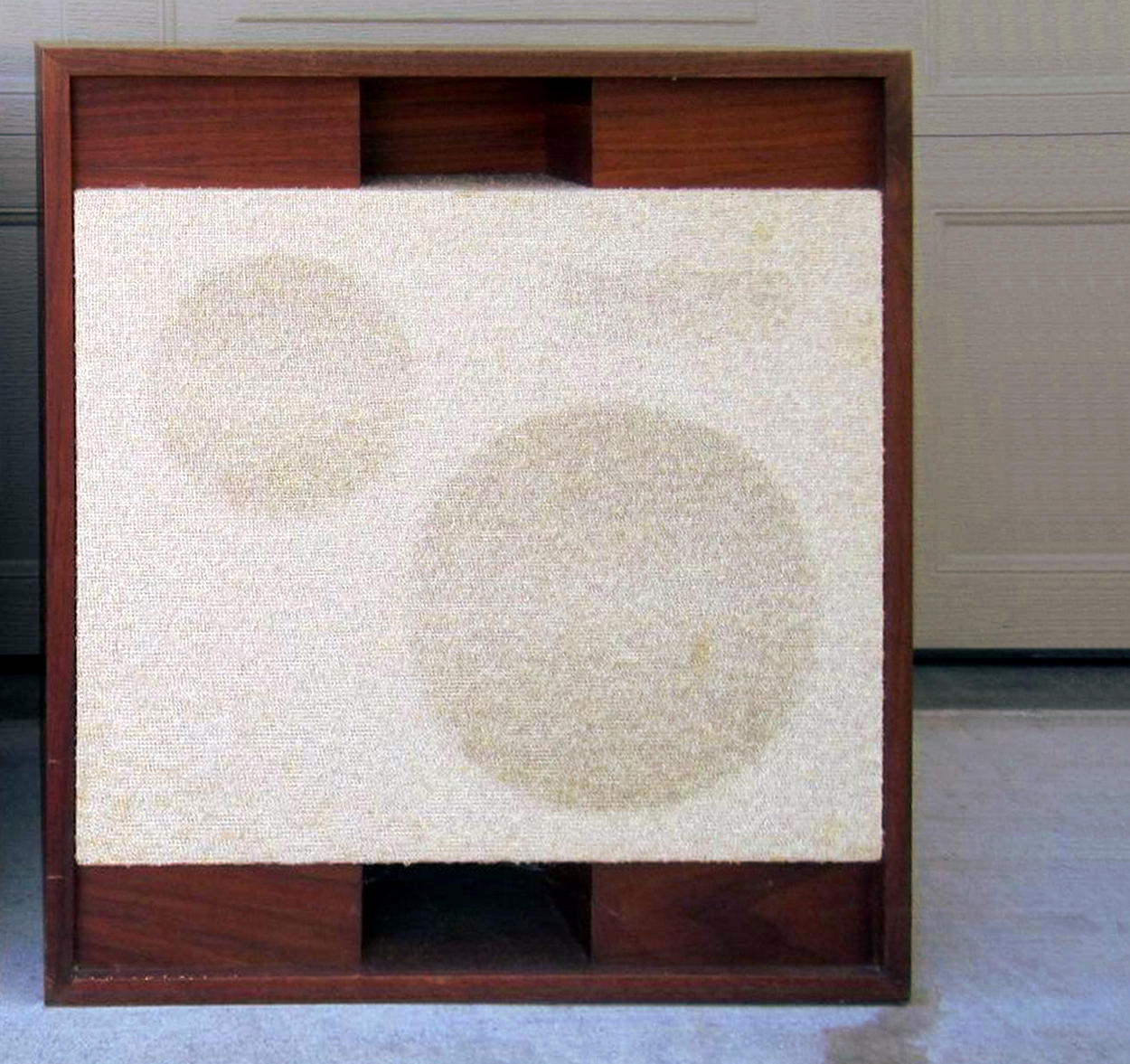
Early speaker from Vega Labs

Cerwin-Vega was founded as Vega Associates (with later name changes to Vega Laboratories and then Cerwin-Vega) by aerospace engineer Eugene J. "Gene" Czerwinski (1927–2010) in 1954, and became noted for producing an 18" speaker capable of producing 130 dB in SPL at 30 Hz, an astonishing level during its time. Another breakthrough product, the world's first solid-state amplifier, was released in 1957. In addition to these innovations, the company became well known for supplying speakers for electric musical instrument companies such as Fender, as well as for movie theaters all through the 1970s.

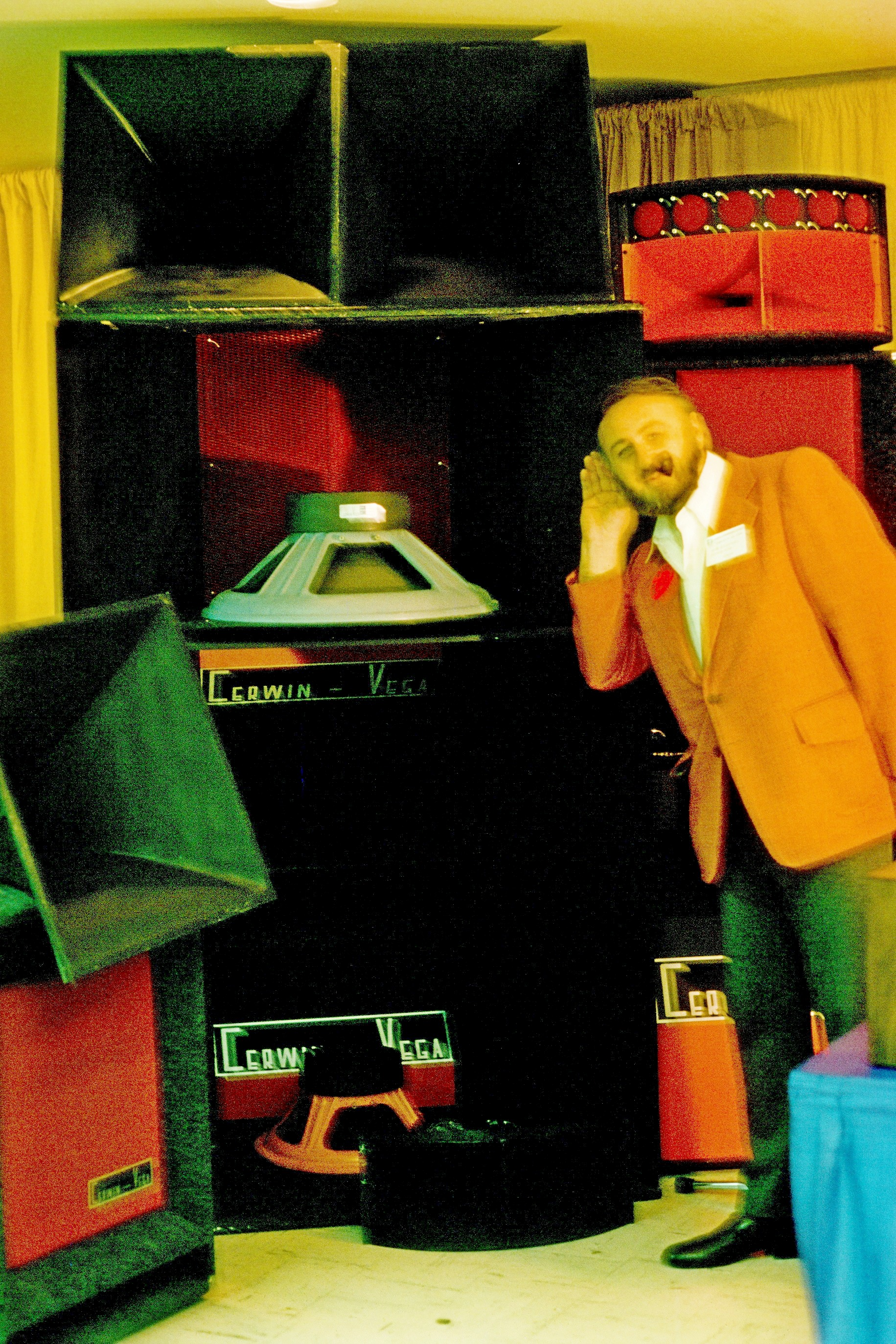
Gene Czerwinski posing in front of Cerwin-Vega loudspeakers at a Los Angeles Audio Engineering Society convention circa 1975.

Cerwin-Vega participated in Sensurround technology which was developed in conjunction with MCA and Universal Studios in the 1970s. Sensurround was a movie theater special effects speaker system which used multiple Cerwin-Vega folded horn subwoofers triggered by an optical soundtrack system to create low frequency effects which simulated vibrations felt during an earthquake or a battle scene. Sensurround was premiered in the 1974 movie Earthquake, and was a great success, but most Sensurround units were later dismantled due to the large amount of space they took up in theaters and the fact only four feature films were ever released in the process.

The earliest known Vega Laboratory speakers were hand made and contained Jensen branded woofers, sealed mid-ranges and horn tweeters in a ported enclosure with a Vega Labs-built crossover. Earliest known models have no serial number or model numbers on the crossovers plates and these are believed to be production prototypes of what would become C-V's popular 12" 3-way speaker systems. In the early 1970s Cerwin-Vega began marketing their "Residential" line of speakers with the Model 24 and Model 26. In the late 1970s and early 1980s, Cerwin-Vega released models A-10, A-123, R-10 (10-inch, 2-way system), R-12 (12-inch, 2-way system), R-123 (12-inch, 3-way system), 12TR (12-inch Tower Reflecting horn), and 15T tower speakers with 12" and 15" downward firing woofers, and the model S-1 bookshelf speakers. The S-1 speaker system was the crowning achievement for Cerwin-Vega. By utilizing a "Sixth Order Butterworth Vent Tuning" and integrating the system with Cerwin-Vega's DB-10B Bass Turbocharger (included with the S-1 speakers), the low frequency range of the S-1 was increased beyond the capabilities of larger enclosures. Cerwin-Vega also delivered various models of efficient semi horn (DHORM) speakers (including the A-10, A-123 and S-1). They featured 10" or 12" woofers and often twin mid-range drivers in a ported enclosure. They were touted to deliver up to 126 decibels of sound pressure.

In the late 1970s and into the 1980s, Cerwin-Vega used a catchy marketing slogan: "Loud is beautiful… if it's clean".

In October 1986 the company moved to a new building in Simi Valley, CA and in August 2004 the company moved to a new building in Chatsworth, CA.

In 2020, Cerwin-Vega business was consolidated to Los Angeles, CA.

== Company divisions ==
The Cerwin-Vega brand was split for some time across two companies; Gibson for Cerwin-Vega and CVDA Holdings for Cerwin-Vega Mobile. In both lines their products are mostly known for its woofers and subwoofers capable of delivering high sound level output with comparatively low frequency ranges using comparatively low power input, as well as the red ring commonly found on the surround of many of their speaker drivers over the decades.

Since 2020, the Mobile and remaining divisions of Cerwin-Vega have been reunited under a common ownership.
