= Subwoofer =

Loudspeaker for low-pitched audio frequencies

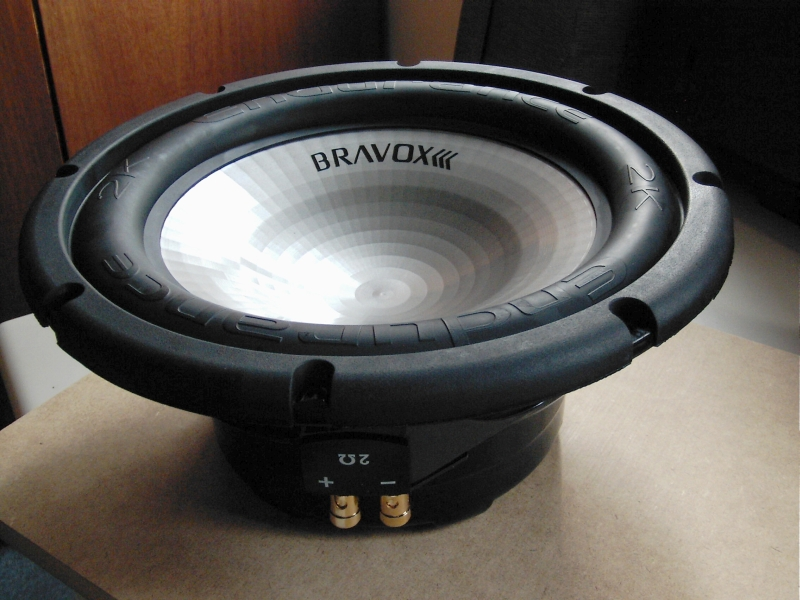
12-inch (30 cm) subwoofer driver (loudspeaker). A driver is commonly installed in an enclosure (often a wooden cabinet) to prevent the sound waves coming off the back of the driver diaphragm from canceling out the sound waves being generated from the front of the subwoofer.

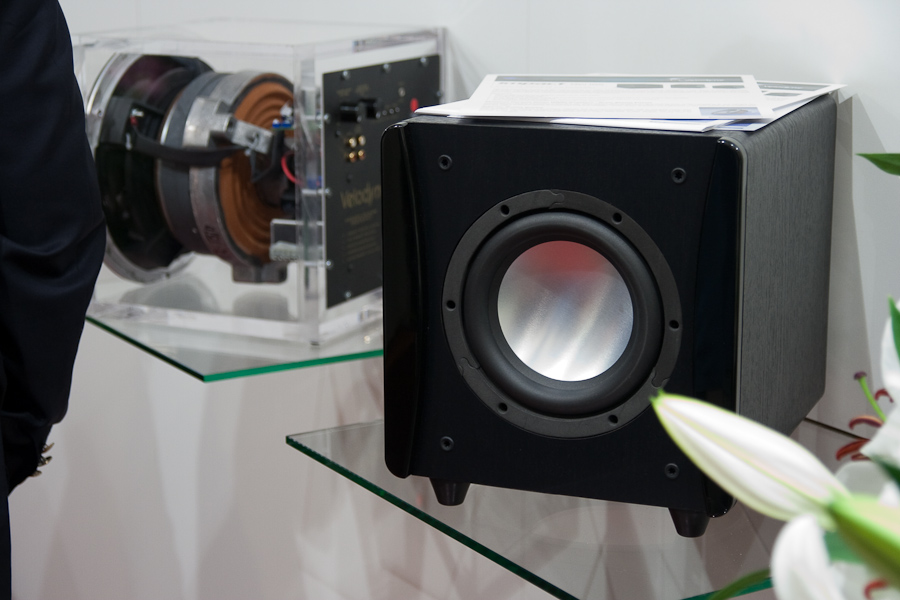
A typical Hi-Fi subwoofer (r.), with the subwoofer loudspeaker built into a cabinet. On the left, a version with transparent cabinet is shown where the large magnet (grayish color) of the speaker driver can be seen in the middle, close to the brown damper.

A subwoofer (or sub) is a loudspeaker designed to reproduce low-pitched audio frequencies, known as bass and sub-bass, that are lower in frequency than those which can be (optimally) generated by a woofer. The typical frequency range that is covered by a subwoofer is about 20–200 Hz for consumer products, below 100 Hz for professional live sound, and below 80 Hz in THX-certified systems. Thus, one or more subwoofers are important for high-quality sound reproduction as they are responsible for the lowest two to three octaves of the ten octaves that are audible. This very low-frequency (VLF) range reproduces the natural fundamental tones of the bass drum, electric bass, double bass, grand piano, contrabassoon, tuba, in addition to thunder, gunshots, explosions, etc.

Subwoofers are never used alone, as they are intended to substitute the VLF sounds of "main" loudspeakers that cover the higher frequency bands. VLF and higher-frequency signals are sent separately to the subwoofer(s) and the mains by a "crossover" network, typically using active electronics, including digital signal processing (DSP). Additionally, subwoofers are fed their own low-frequency effects (LFE) signals that are reproduced up to 10 dB higher than standard peak level.

Subwoofers can be positioned more favorably than the main speakers' woofers in the typical listening room acoustic, as the very low frequencies they reproduce are nearly omnidirectional and their direction is hard to determine. However, much digitally recorded content contains lifelike binaural cues that human hearing may be able to detect in the VLF range, reproduced by a stereo crossover and two or more subwoofers. Subwoofers are not acceptable to all audiophiles, likely due to distortion artifacts produced by the subwoofer driver after the crossover and at frequencies above the crossover.

While the term "subwoofer" technically only refers to the speaker driver, in common parlance, the term often refers to a subwoofer driver mounted in a speaker enclosure (cabinet), often with a built-in amplifier.

Subwoofers are made up of one or more woofers mounted in a loudspeaker enclosure—often made of wood—capable of withstanding air pressure while resisting deformation. Subwoofer enclosures come in a variety of designs, including bass reflex (with a port or vent), using a subwoofer and one or more passive radiator speakers in the enclosure, acoustic suspension (sealed enclosure), infinite baffle, horn-loaded, tapped horn, transmission line, bandpass or isobaric designs. Each design has unique trade-offs with respect to efficiency, low-frequency range, loudness, cabinet size, and cost. Passive subwoofers have a subwoofer driver and enclosure, but they are powered by an external amplifier. Active subwoofers include a built-in amplifier.

The first home audio subwoofers were developed in the 1960s to add bass response to home stereo systems. Subwoofers came into greater popular consciousness in the 1970s with the introduction of Sensurround in movies such as Earthquake, which produced loud low-frequency sounds through large subwoofers. With the advent of the compact cassette and the compact disc in the 1980s, the reproduction of deep and loud bass was no longer limited by the ability of a phonograph record stylus to track a groove, and producers could add more low-frequency content to recordings. As well, during the 1990s, DVDs were increasingly recorded with "surround sound" processes that included a low-frequency effects (LFE) channel, which could be heard using the subwoofer in home-cinema (also called home theater) systems. During the 1990s, subwoofers also became increasingly popular in home stereo systems, custom car audio installations, and in PA systems. By the 2000s, subwoofers became almost universal in sound reinforcement systems in nightclubs and concert venues.

Unlike a system's main loudspeakers, subwoofers can be positioned more optimally in a listening room's acoustic. However, subwoofers are not universally accepted by audiophiles amid complaints of the difficulty of "splicing" the sound with that of the main speakers around the crossover frequency. This is largely due to the subwoofer driver's non-linearity producing harmonic and intermodulation distortion products well above the crossover frequency, and into the range where human hearing can "localize" them, wrecking the stereo "image".

== History ==
View of the underside of the downward-firing Infinity Servo Statik 1, showing the size of the 18-inch (45 cm) custom-wound Cerwin-Vega driver in relation to a soda can for scale

=== 1920s to 1950s precursors ===
From about 1900 to the 1950s, the "lowest frequency in practical use" in recordings, broadcasting and music playback was 100 Hz. When sound was developed for motion pictures, the basic RCA sound system was a single 8-inch (20 cm) speaker mounted in straight horn, an approach which was deemed unsatisfactory by Hollywood decisionmakers, who hired Western Electric engineers to develop a better speaker system. The early Western Electric experiments added a set of 18-inch drivers for the low end in a large, open-backed baffle (extending the range down to 40 Hz) and a high-frequency unit, but MGM was not pleased with the sound of the three-way system, as they had concerns about the delay between the different drivers.

In 1933, the head of MGM's sound department, Douglas Shearer, worked with John Hilliard and James B. Lansing (who would later found Altec Lansing in 1941 and JBL in 1946) to develop a new speaker system that used a two-way enclosure with a W-shaped bass horn that could go as low as 40 Hz. The Shearing-Lansing 500-A ended up being used in "screening rooms, dubbing theaters, and early sound reinforcement". In the late 1930s, Lansing created a smaller two-way speaker with a 15-inch (38 cm) woofer in a vented enclosure, which he called the Iconic system; it was used as a studio monitor and in high-end home hi-fi set-ups.

During the 1940s swing era, to get deeper bass, "pipelike opening[s]" were cut into speaker enclosures, creating bass reflex enclosures, as it was found that even a fairly inexpensive speaker enclosure, once modified in this way, could "transmit the driving power of a heavy...drumbeat—and sometimes not much else—to a crowded dancefloor." Prior to the development of the first subwoofers, woofers were used to reproduce bass frequencies, usually with a crossover point set at 200 Hz and a 4-inch (10 cm) loudspeaker in an infinite baffle or in professional sound applications, a "hybrid horn-loaded" bass reflex enclosure (such as the 15-inch Altec Lansing A-7 enclosure nicknamed the "Voice of the Theater", which was introduced in 1946). In the mid-1950s, the Academy of Motion Picture Arts and Sciences selected the "big, boxy" Altec A-7 as the industry standard for movie sound reproduction in theaters.

=== 1960s: first subwoofers ===
In September 1964, Raymon Dones, of El Cerrito, California, received the first patent for a subwoofer specifically designed to augment omnidirectionally the low frequency range of modern stereo systems (US patent 3150739). It was able to reproduce distortion-free low frequencies down to 15 cycles per second (15 Hz). A specific objective of Dones's invention was to provide portable sound enclosures capable of high fidelity reproduction of low frequency sound waves without giving an audible indication of the direction from which they emanated. Dones's loudspeaker was marketed in the US under the trade name "The Octavium" from the early 1960s to the mid-1970s. The Octavium was utilized by several recording artists of that era, most notably the Grateful Dead, bassist Monk Montgomery, bassist Nathan East, and the Pointer Sisters. The Octavium speaker and Dones's subwoofer technology were also utilized, in a few select theaters, to reproduce low pitch frequencies for the 1974 blockbuster movie Earthquake. During the late 1960s, Dones's Octavium was favorably reviewed by audiophile publications including Hi-Fi News and Audio Magazine.

Another early subwoofer enclosure made for home and studio use was the separate bass speaker for the Servo Statik 1 by New Technology Enterprises. Designed as a prototype in 1966 by physicist Arnold Nudell and airline pilot Cary Christie in Nudell's garage, it used a second winding around a custom Cerwin-Vega 18-inch (45 cm) driver to provide servo control information to the amplifier, and it was offered for sale at $1795, some 40% more expensive than any other complete loudspeaker listed at Stereo Review. In 1968, the two found outside investors and reorganized as Infinity. The subwoofer was reviewed positively in Stereophile magazine's winter 1968 issue as the SS-1 by Infinity. The SS-1 received very good reviews in 1970 from High Fidelity magazine.

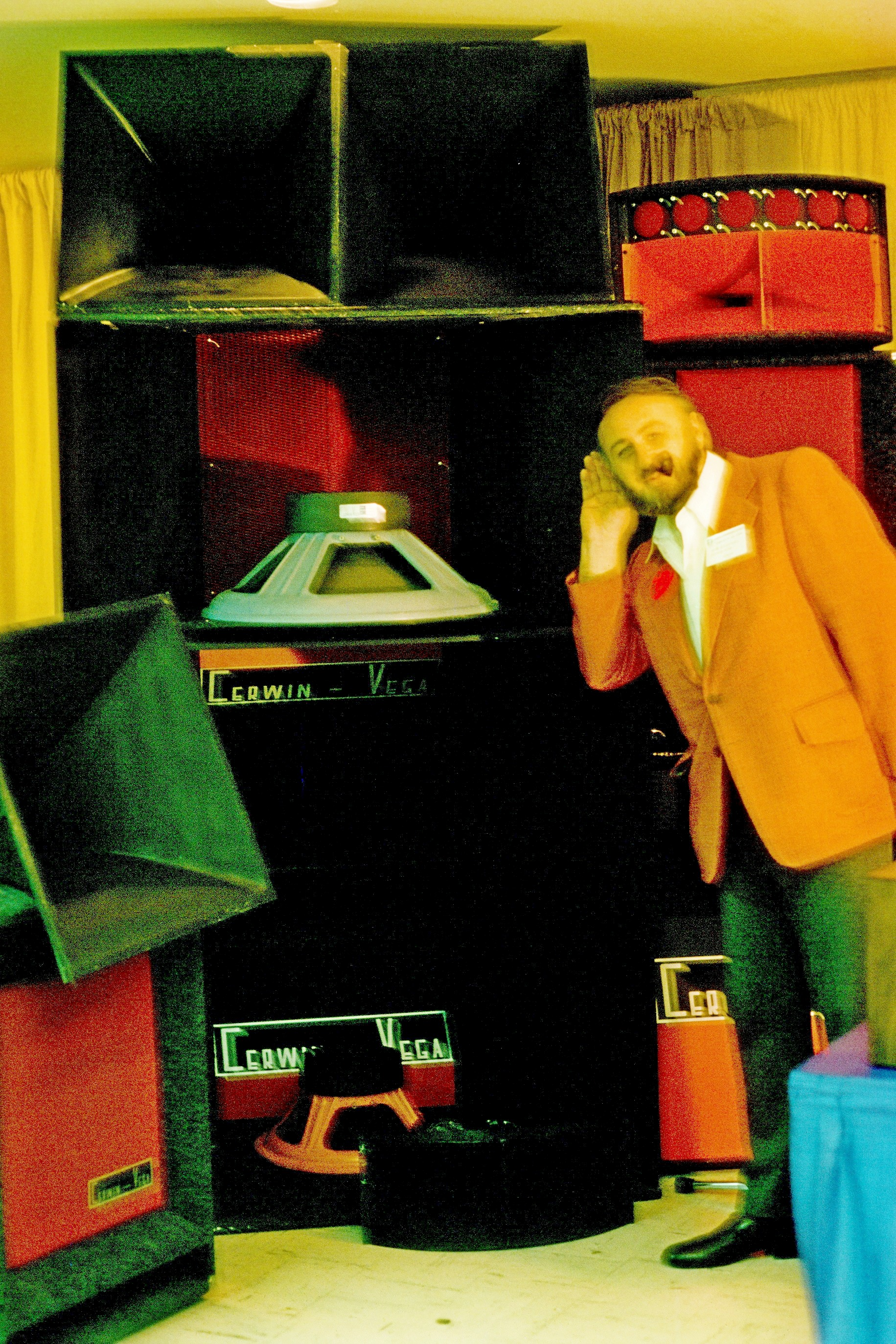
A display of Cerwin-Vega speaker enclosures at the 1975 Audio Engineering Society meeting

Another of the early subwoofers was developed during the late 1960s by Ken Kreisel, the former president of the Miller & Kreisel Sound Corporation in Los Angeles. When Kreisel's business partner, Jonas Miller, who owned a high-end audio store in Los Angeles, told Kreisel that some purchasers of the store's high-end electrostatic speakers had complained about a lack of bass response in the electrostatics, Kreisel designed a powered woofer that would reproduce only those frequencies that were too low for the electrostatic speakers to convey. Infinity's full range electrostatic speaker system that was developed during the 1960s also used a woofer to cover the lower frequency range that its electrostatic arrays did not handle adequately.

=== 1970s to 1980s ===
The first use of a subwoofer in a recording session was in 1973 for mixing the Steely Dan album Pretzel Logic, when recording engineer Roger Nichols arranged for Kreisel to bring a prototype of his subwoofer to Village Recorders. Further design modifications were made by Kreisel over the next ten years, and in the 1970s and 1980s by engineer John P. D'Arcy; record producer Daniel Levitin served as a consultant and "golden ears" for the design of the crossover network (used to partition the frequency spectrum so that the subwoofer would not attempt to reproduce frequencies too high for its effective range, and so that the main speakers would not need to handle frequencies too low for their effective range). In 1976, Kreisel created the first satellite speakers and subwoofer system, named "David and Goliath".

Subwoofers received a great deal of publicity in 1974 with the movie Earthquake, which was released in Sensurround. Initially installed in 17 U.S. theaters, the Cerwin-Vega "Sensurround" system used large subwoofers that were driven by racks of 500 watt amplifiers, triggered by control tones printed on one of the audio tracks on the film. Four of the subwoofers were positioned in front of the audience under (or behind) the film screen and two more were placed together at the rear of the audience on a platform. Powerful noise energy and loud rumbling in the range of 17 to 120 Hz were generated at the level of 110–120 decibels of sound pressure level, abbreviated dB(SPL). The new low frequency entertainment method helped the film become a box office success. More Sensurround systems were assembled and installed. By 1976, there were almost 300 Sensurround systems leapfrogging through select theaters. Other films to use the effect include the WW II naval battle epic Midway in 1976 and Rollercoaster in 1977.

For owners of 33 rpm LPs and 45 rpm singles, loud and deep bass was limited by the ability of the phonograph record stylus to track the groove. While some hi-fi aficionados had solved the problem by using other playback sources, such as reel-to-reel tape players which were capable of delivering accurate, naturally deep bass from acoustic sources, or synthetic bass not found in nature, with the popular introduction of the compact cassette in the late 1960s it became possible to add more low frequency content to recordings. By the mid-1970s, 12-inch vinyl singles, which allowed for "more bass volume", were used to record disco, reggae, dub and hip-hop tracks; dance club DJs played these records in clubs with subwoofers to achieve "physical and emotional" reactions from dancers.

In the early 1970s, David Mancuso hired sound engineer Alex Rosner to design additional subwoofers for his disco dance events, along with "tweeter arrays" to "boost the treble and bass at opportune moments" at his private, underground parties at The Loft. The demand for sub-bass sound reinforcement in the 1970s was driven by the important role of "powerful bass drum" in disco, as compared with rock and pop; to provide this deeper range, a third crossover point from 40 to 120 Hz (centering on 80 Hz) was added. The Paradise Garage discotheque in New York City, which operated from 1977 to 1987, had "custom designed 'sub-bass' speakers" developed by Alex Rosner's disciple, sound engineer Richard ("Dick") Long that were called "Levan Horns" (in honor of resident DJ Larry Levan).

By the end of the 1970s, subwoofers were used in dance venue sound systems to enable the playing of "[b]ass-heavy dance music" that we "do not 'hear' with our ears but with our entire body". At the club, Long used four Levan bass horns, one in each corner of the dancefloor, to create a "haptic and tactile quality" in the sub-bass that you could feel in your body. To overcome the lack of sub-bass frequencies on 1970s disco records (sub-bass frequencies below 60 Hz were removed during mastering), Long added a DBX 100 "Boom Box" subharmonic pitch generator into his system to synthesize 25 to 50 Hz sub-bass from the 50 to 100 Hz bass on the records.

By the later 1970s, disco club sound engineers were using the same large Cerwin-Vega Sensurround-style folded horn subwoofers that were used in Earthquake and similar movies in dance club system installations. In the early 1980s, Long designed a sound system for the Warehouse dance club, with "huge stacks of subwoofers" which created "deep and intense" bass frequencies that "pound[ed] through your system" and "entire body", enabling clubgoers to "viscerally experience" the DJs' house music mixes.

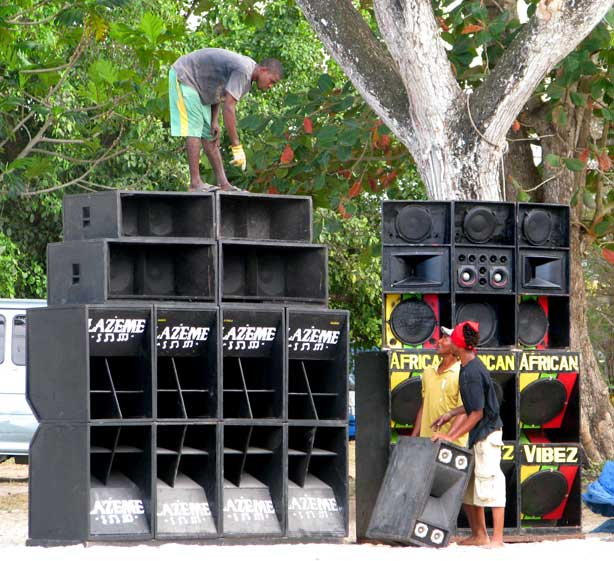
A crew sets up a sound system, including large bass bins, in Jamaica in 2009.

In Jamaica in the 1970s and 1980s, sound engineers for reggae sound systems began creating "heavily customized" subwoofer enclosures by adding foam and tuning the cabinets to achieve "rich and articulate speaker output below 100 Hz". The sound engineers who developed the "bass-heavy signature sound" of sound reinforcement systems have been called "deserving as much credit for the sound of Jamaican music as their better-known music producer cousins". The sound engineers for Stone Love Movement (a sound system crew), for example, modified folded horn subwoofers they imported from the US to get more of a bass reflex sound that suited local tone preferences for dancehall audiences, as the unmodified folded horn was found to be "too aggressive" sounding and "not deep enough for Jamaican listeners".

In sound system culture, there are both "low and high bass bins" in "towering piles" that are "delivered in large trucks" and set up by a crew of "box boys", and then positioned and adjusted by the sound engineer in a process known as "stringing up", all to create the "sound of reggae music you can literally feel as it comes off these big speakers". Sound system crews hold 'sound clash' competitions, where each sound system is set up and then the two crews try to outdo each other, both in terms of loudness and the "bass it produced".

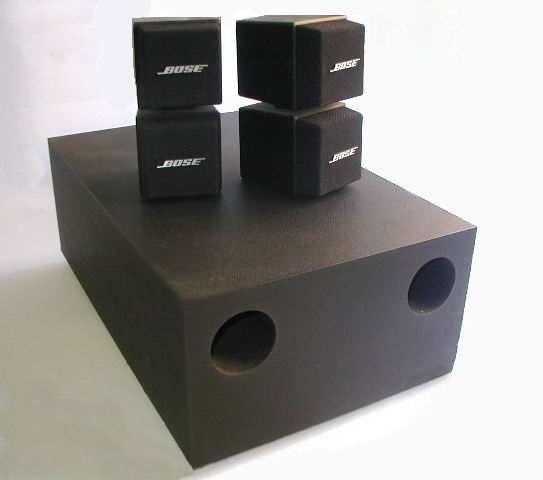
The 1987 Bose Acoustimass 5 stereo bass driver contained one six-inch (152 mm) driver per channel and provided crossover filtering for its two cube speaker arrays.

In the 1980s, the Bose Acoustimass AM-5 became a popular subwoofer and small high-range satellite speaker system for home listening. Steve Feinstein stated that with the AM-5, the system's "appearance mattered as much as, if not more than, great sound" to consumers of this era, as it was considered to be a "cool" look. The success of the AM-5 led to other makers launching subwoofer-satellite speaker systems, including Boston Acoustics Sub Sat 6 and 7, and the Cambridge SoundWorks Ensemble systems (by Kloss). Claims that these sub-satellite systems showed manufacturers and designers that home-cinema systems with a hidden subwoofer could be "feasible and workable in a normal living room" for mainstream consumers. Despite criticism of the AM-5 from audio experts, regarding a lack of bass range below 60 Hz, an "acoustic hole" in the 120 to 200 Hz range and a lack of upper range above 13 kHz for the satellites, the AM-5 system represented 30% of the US speaker market in the early 1990s.

In the 1980s, Origin Acoustics developed the first residential in-wall subwoofer named Composer. It used an aluminum 10-inch (25.4 cm) driver and a foam-lined enclosure designed to be mounted directly into wall studs during the construction of a new home. The frequency response for the Composer is 30 to 250 Hz.

=== 1990s to 2010s ===
While in the 1960s and 1970s deep bass speakers were once an exotic commodity owned by audiophiles, by the mid-1990s they were much more popular and widely used, with different sizes and capabilities of sound output. An example of 1990s subwoofer use in sound reinforcement is the Ministry of Sound dance club which opened in 1991 in London. The dancefloor's sound system was based on Richard Long's design at Paradise Garage. The club spent about £500,000 on a sound system that used Martin Audio components in custom-built cabinets, including twelve 21" 9,500 watt active subwoofers, twelve 18-inch subwoofers and twelve Martin Audio W8C mid-high speakers.

The popularity of the CD made it possible to add more low frequency content to recordings and satisfy a larger number of consumers. Home subwoofers grew in popularity, as they were easy to add to existing multimedia speaker setups and they were easy to position or hide.

In 2015, Damon Krukowski wrote an article entitled "Drop the Bass: A Case Against Subwoofers" for Pitchfork magazine, based on his performing experience with Galaxie 500; he argues that "for certain styles of music", especially acoustic music genres, "these low-end behemoths are actually ruining our listening experience" by reducing the clarity of the low end. In 2015, John Hunter from REL Acoustics stated that audiophiles tend to "have a love/hate relationship with subwoofers" because most subs have "awful", "entry-level" sound quality and they are used in an "inappropriate way", without integrating the bass seamlessly.

In 2018, some electronic dance music (EDM) sound systems for venues that play hardcore bass have multiple subwoofer arrays to deal with upper-bass (80–100 Hz), mid-bass (40–80 Hz), and "sub-bass" (20–40 Hz).

== Construction and features ==
Cross-section of a subwoofer drive unit

Loudspeaker and enclosure design

Subwoofers use speaker drivers (woofers) typically between 8-inch (20 cm) and 21-inch (53 cm) in diameter. Some uncommon subwoofers use larger drivers, and single prototype subwoofers as large as 60-inch (152 cm) have been fabricated. On the smaller end of the spectrum, subwoofer drivers as small as 4-inch (10 cm) may be used. Small subwoofer drivers in the 4-inch range are typically used in small computer speaker systems and compact home-cinema subwoofer cabinets. The size of the driver and number of drivers in a cabinet depends on the design of the loudspeaker enclosure, the size of the cabinet, the desired sound pressure level, the lowest frequency targeted and the level of permitted distortion. The most common subwoofer driver sizes used for sound reinforcement in nightclubs, raves and pop/rock concerts are 10-, 12-, 15- and 18-inch models (25 cm, 30 cm, 38 cm, and 45 cm respectively). The largest available sound reinforcement subwoofers, 21-inch (53 cm) drivers, are less commonly seen.

The reference efficiency of a loudspeaker system in its passband is given by:

$$\eta_0 = \frac{4 \pi^2}{c^3} \cdot \frac{f_s^3 V_{as}}{Q_{es}}$$

where $c$ is the speed of sound in air and the variables are Thiele/Small parameters: $f_s$ is the resonance frequency of the driver, $V_{as}$ is the volume of air having the same acoustic compliance as the driver suspension, and $Q_{es}$ is the driver $Q$ at $f_s$ considering the electrical DC resistance of the driver voice coil. Deep low-frequency extension is a common goal for a subwoofer and small box volumes are also considered desirable, to save space and reduce the size for ease of transportation (in the case of sound reinforcement and DJ subwoofers). Hofmann's "Iron Law" therefore mandates low efficiency under those constraints, and indeed most subwoofers require considerable power, much more than other individual drivers.

So, for the example of a closed-box loudspeaker system, the box volume $V_{ab}$ to achieve a given total $Q$ of the system $Q_{tc}$ is proportional to $V_{as}$:

$$V_{ab} = \frac{V_{as}}{\alpha}$$

where $\alpha$ is the system compliance ratio given by the ratio of the driver compliance and the enclosure compliance, which can be written as:

$$\alpha = \frac{Q_{tc}^2}{Q_{ts}^2}-1 = \frac{f_c^2}{f_s^2}-1$$

where $f_c$ is the system resonance frequency.

Therefore, a decrease in box volume (i.e., a smaller speaker cabinet) and the same $f_3$ will decrease the efficiency of the subwoofer. The normalized half-power frequency of a closed-box loudspeaker system is given by:

$$f_3/ f_c = \left[ \frac{(1/Q_{tc}^2-2)+\sqrt{(1/Q_{tc}^2-2)^2+4}}{2} \right] ^{1/2}$$

Here we note that if $Q_{tc}=1/\sqrt{2} \approx 0.7071$, then $f_3=f_c$.

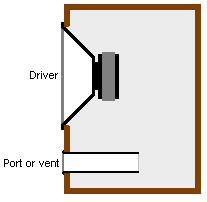
Bass reflex enclosure schematic (cross-section)

As the efficiency is proportional to $f_s^3$, small improvements in low-frequency extension with the same driver and box volume will result in very significant reductions in efficiency. For these reasons, subwoofers are typically very inefficient at converting electrical energy into sound energy. This combination of factors accounts for the higher amplifier power required to drive subwoofers, and the requirement for greater power handling for subwoofer drivers. Enclosure variations (e.g., bass reflex designs with a port in the cabinet) are often used for subwoofers to increase the efficiency of the driver/enclosure system, helping to reduce the amplifier power requirements. Vented-box loudspeaker systems have a maximum theoretical efficiency that is 2.9 dB greater than that of the closed-box system.

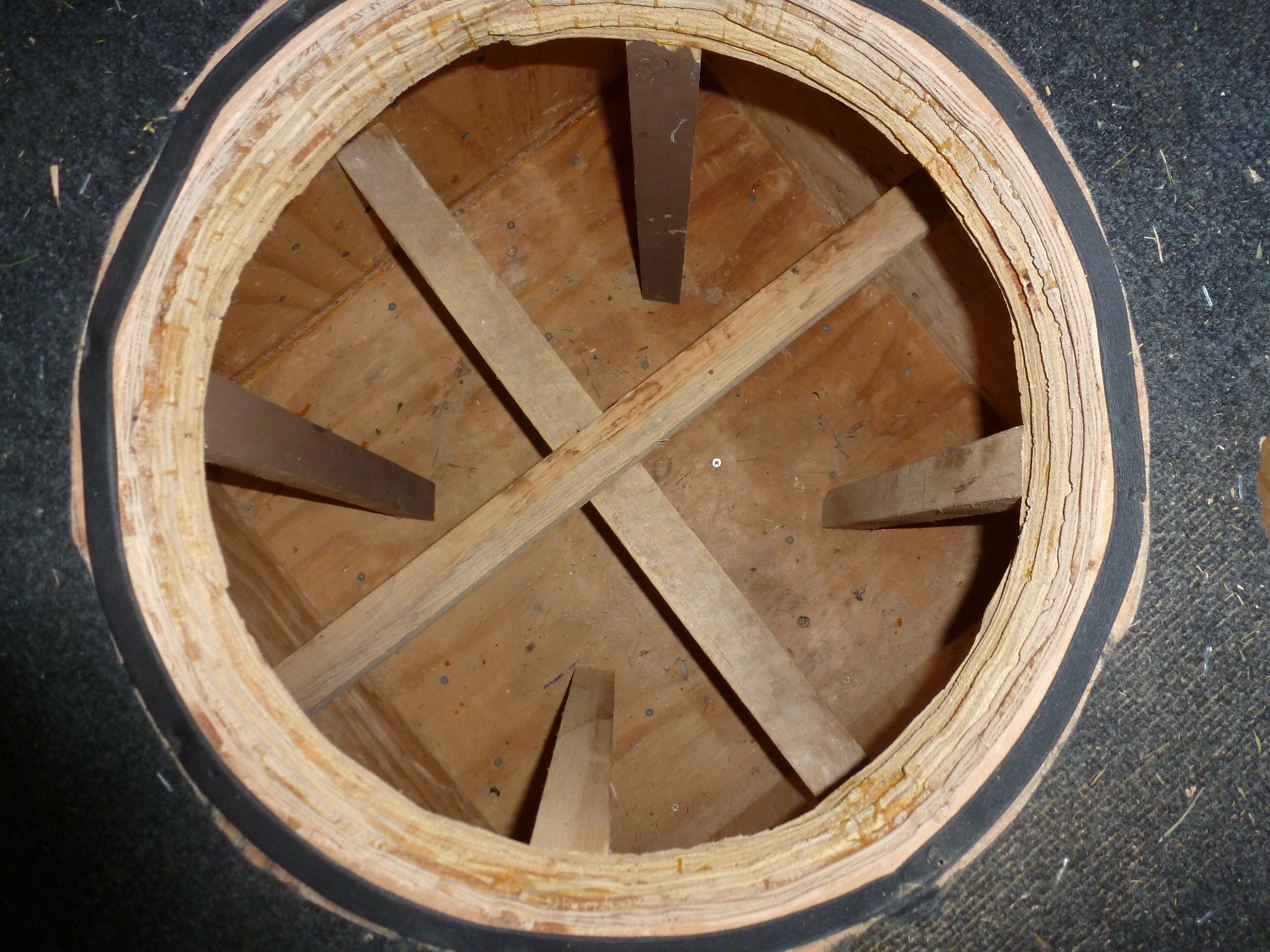
Heavily braced and built subwoofer enclosure

Subwoofers are typically constructed by mounting one or more woofers in a cabinet of medium-density fibreboard (MDF), oriented strand board (OSB), plywood, fiberglass, aluminum or other stiff materials. Because of the high air pressure that they produce in the cabinet, subwoofer enclosures often require internal bracing to distribute the resulting forces.

Subwoofers have been designed using a number of enclosure approaches: bass reflex (with a port or vent), using a subwoofer and one or more passive radiator speakers in the enclosure, acoustic suspension (sealed enclosure), infinite baffle, horn-loaded, tapped horn, transmission line and bandpass. Each enclosure type has advantages and disadvantages in terms of efficiency increase, bass extension, cabinet size, distortion, and cost.

Multiple enclosure types may even be combined in a single design, such as in computer audio with the subwoofer design of the Labtec LCS-2424 (later acquired by Logitech and used for their Z340/Z540/Z640/Z3/Z4), which is a (primitive) passive radiator bandpass enclosure with a bass reflex dividing chamber.

While not necessarily an enclosure type, isobaric (such as push-pull) coupled loading of two drivers has sometimes been used in subwoofer products of computer, home cinema and sound reinforcement class, and also DIY versions in automotive applications, to provide relatively deep bass for their size. Self-contained "isobaric-like" driver assemblies have been manufactured since the 2010s.

The smallest subwoofers are typically those designed for desktop multimedia systems. The largest common subwoofer enclosures are those used for concert sound reinforcement systems or dance club sound systems. An example of a large concert subwoofer enclosure is the 1980s-era Electro-Voice MT-4 "Bass Cube" system, which used four 18-inch (45 cm) drivers. An example of a subwoofer that uses a bass horn is the Bassmaxx B-Two, which loads an 18-inch (45 cm) driver onto an 11-foot (3.4 m) long folded horn. Folded horn-type subwoofers can typically produce a deeper range with greater efficiency than the same driver in an enclosure that lacks a horn. However, folded horn cabinets are typically larger and heavier than front-firing enclosures, so folded horns are less commonly used. Some experimental fixed-installation subwoofer horns have been constructed using brick and concrete to produce a very long horn that allows a very deep sub-bass extension.

Subwoofer output level can be increased by increasing cone surface area or by increasing cone excursion. Since large drivers require undesirably large cabinets, most subwoofer drivers have large excursions. Unfortunately, high excursion, at high power levels, tends to produce more distortion from inherent mechanical and magnetic effects in electro-dynamic drivers (the most common sort). The conflict between assorted goals can never be fully resolved; subwoofer designs necessarily involve tradeoffs and compromises. Hofmann's Iron Law (the efficiency of a woofer system is directly proportional to its cabinet volume (as in size) and to the cube of its cutoff frequency, that is how low in pitch it will go) applies to subwoofers just as it does to all loudspeakers. Thus, a subwoofer enclosure designer aiming at the deepest-pitched bass will probably have to consider using a large enclosure size; a subwoofer enclosure designer instructed to create the smallest possible cabinet (to make transportation easier) will need to compromise how low in pitch their cabinet will go.

=== Frequency range and frequency response ===
The frequency response specification of a speaker describes the range of frequencies or musical tones a speaker can reproduce, measured in hertz (Hz). The typical frequency range for a subwoofer is between 20–200 Hz. Professional concert sound system subwoofers typically operate below 100 Hz, and THX-certified systems operate below 80 Hz. Subwoofers vary in terms of the range of pitches that they can reproduce, depending on a number of factors such as the size of the cabinet and the construction and design of the enclosure and driver(s). Specifications of frequency response depend wholly for relevance on an accompanying amplitude value—measurements taken with a wider amplitude tolerance will give any loudspeaker a wider frequency response. For example, the JBL 4688 TCB Subwoofer System, a now-discontinued system which was designed for movie theaters, had a frequency response of 23–350 Hz when measured within a 10-decibel boundary (0 dB to −10 dB) and a narrower frequency response of 28–120 Hz when measured within a 6-decibel boundary (±3 dB).

Subwoofers also vary in regard to the sound pressure levels achievable and the distortion levels that they produce over their range. Some subwoofers, such as The Abyss by MartinLogan for example, can reproduce pitches down to around 18 Hz (which is about the pitch of the lowest rumbling notes on a huge pipe organ with 32-foot (9.8 m) 16 Hz bass pipes) to 100 Hz (±3 dB). Nevertheless, even though the Abyss subwoofer can go down to 18 Hz, its lowest frequency and maximum SPL with a limit of 10% distortion is 35.5 Hz and 79.8 dB at 2 meters. This means that a person choosing a subwoofer needs to consider more than just the lowest pitch that the subwoofer can reproduce.

=== Amplification ===
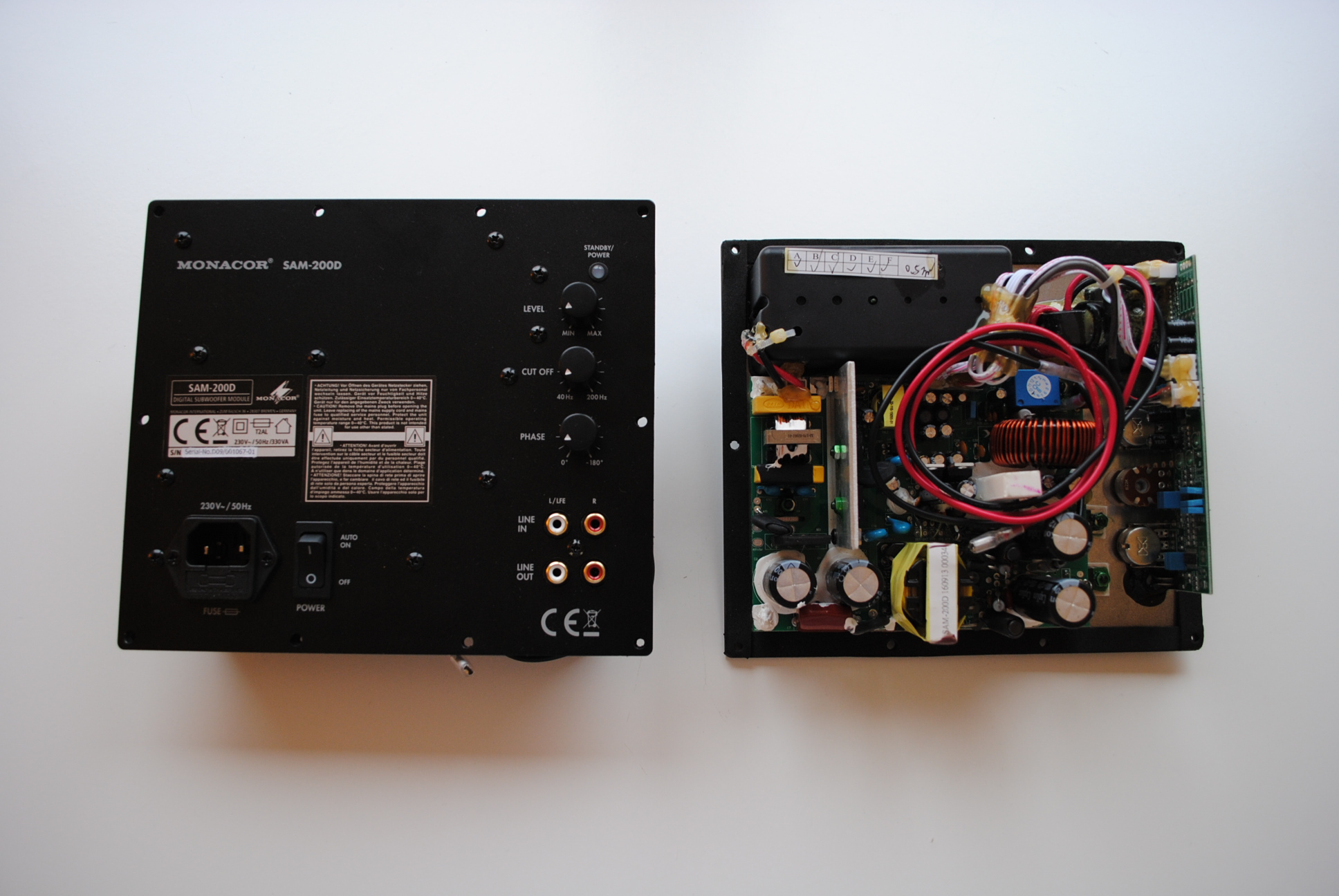
The internal components of an active (powered) subwoofer, showing the circuitry for the power amplifier

'Active subwoofers' include their own dedicated amplifiers within the cabinet. Some also include user-adjustable equalization that allows boosted or reduced output at particular frequencies; these vary from a simple "boost" switch, to fully parametric equalizers meant for detailed speaker and room correction. Some such systems are even supplied with a calibrated microphone to measure the subwoofer's in-room response, so the automatic equalizer can correct the combination of subwoofer, subwoofer location, and room response to minimize the effects of room modes and improve low-frequency performance.

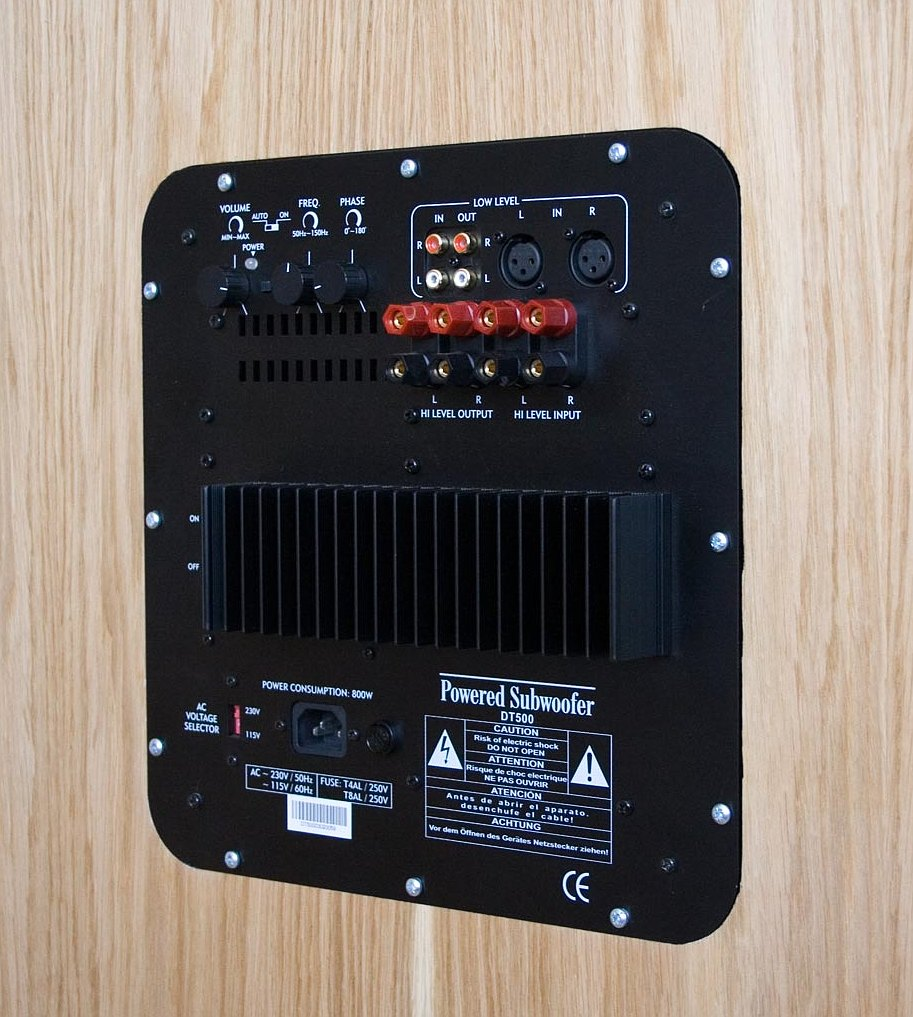
This rear panel of a powered subwoofer shows the heat sinks used to cool the power amplifier.

'Passive subwoofers' have a subwoofer driver and enclosure, but they do not include an amplifier. They sometimes incorporate internal passive crossovers, with the filter frequency determined at the factory. These are generally used with third-party power amplifiers, taking their inputs from active crossovers earlier in the signal chain. Inexpensive home-theater-in-a-box (HTIB) packages often come with a passive subwoofer cabinet that is amplified by the multi-channel amplifier. While few high-end home-cinema systems use passive subwoofers, this format is still popular in the professional sound industry.

=== Equalization ===
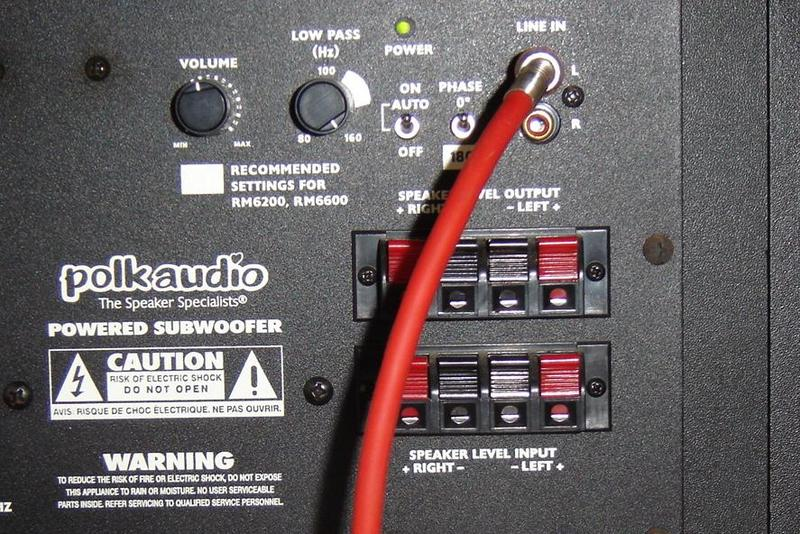
The rear panel of a Polk subwoofer cabinet, showing a low-pass filter adjustment knob

Equalization can be used to adjust the in-room response of a subwoofer system. Designers of active subwoofers sometimes include a degree of corrective equalization to compensate for known performance issues (e.g., a steeper than desired low end roll-off rate). In addition, many amplifiers include an adjustable low-pass filter, which prevents undesired higher frequencies from reaching the subwoofer driver. For example, if a listener's main speakers are usable down to 100 Hz, then the subwoofer filter can be set so the subwoofer only works below 100 Hz. Typical filters involve some overlap in frequency ranges; a steep 4th-order 24 dB/octave low-pass filter is generally desired for subwoofers in order to minimize the overlap region. The filter section may also include a high-pass "infrasonic" or "subsonic" filter, which prevents the subwoofer driver from attempting to reproduce frequencies below its safe capabilities. Setting an infrasonic filter is important on bass reflex subwoofer cabinets, as the bass reflex design tends to create the risk of cone overexcursion at pitches below those of the port tuning, which can cause distortion and damage the subwoofer driver. For example, in a ported subwoofer enclosure tuned to 30 Hz, one may wish to filter out pitches below the tuning frequency; that is, frequencies below 30 Hz.

Some systems use parametric equalization in an attempt to correct for room frequency response irregularities. Equalization is often unable to achieve flat frequency response at all listening locations, in part because of the resonance (i.e. standing wave) patterns at low frequencies in nearly all rooms. Careful positioning of the subwoofer within the room can also help flatten the frequency response. Multiple subwoofers can manage a flatter general response since they can often be arranged to excite room modes more evenly than a single subwoofer, allowing equalization to be more effective.

=== Phase control ===
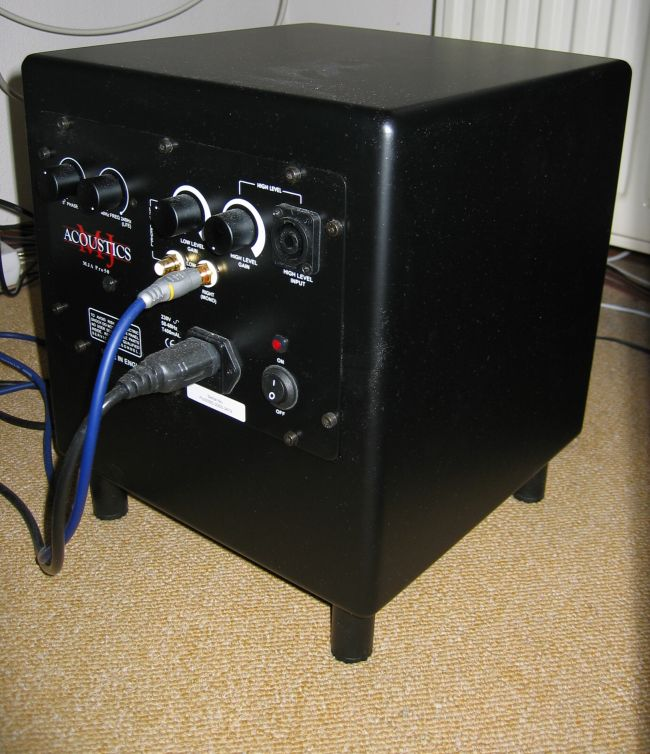
The rear panel of a down-firing, active subwoofer cabinet

Changing the relative phase of the subwoofer with respect to the woofers in other speakers may or may not help to minimize unwanted destructive acoustic interference in the frequency region covered by both the subwoofer and the main speakers. It may not help at all frequencies, and may create further problems with frequency response, but even so is generally provided as an adjustment for subwoofer amplifiers. Phase control circuits may be a simple polarity reversal switch or a more complex continuously variable circuit.

Continuously variable phase control circuits are common in subwoofer amplifiers, and may be found in crossovers and as do-it-yourself electronics projects. Phase controls allow the listener to change the arrival time of the subwoofer sound waves relative to the same frequencies from the main speakers (i.e. at and around the crossover point to the subwoofer). A similar effect can be achieved with the delay control on many home-cinema receivers. The subwoofer phase control found on many subwoofer amplifiers is actually a polarity inversion switch. It allows users to reverse the polarity of the subwoofer relative to the audio signal it is being given. This type of control allows the subwoofer to either be in phase with the source signal, or 180 degrees out of phase.

The subwoofer phase can still be changed by moving the subwoofer closer to or further from the listening position, however this may not be always practical.

=== Servo subwoofers ===
Some active subwoofers use a servo feedback mechanism based on cone movement that modifies the signal sent to the voice coil. The servo feedback signal is derived from a comparison of the input signal to the amplifier versus the actual motion of the cone. The usual source of the feedback signal is a few turns of voice coil attached to the cone or a microchip-based accelerometer placed on the cone itself. An advantage of a well-implemented servo subwoofer design is reduced distortion making smaller enclosure sizes possible. The primary disadvantages are cost and complexity.

Servo-controlled subwoofers are not the same as Tom Danley's ServoDrive subwoofers, whose primary mechanism of sound reproduction avoids the normal voice coil and magnet combination in favor of a high-speed belt-driven servomotor. The ServoDrive design increases output power, reduces harmonic distortion and virtually eliminates power compression, the loss of loudspeaker output that results from an increase in voice coil impedance due to overheating of the voice coil. This feature allows high-power operation for extended periods of time. Intersonics was nominated for a TEC Award for its ServoDrive Loudspeaker (SDL) design in 1986 and for the Bass Tech 7 model in 1990.

== Applications ==
=== Home audio ===
The use of a subwoofer augments the bass capability of the main speakers, and allows them to be smaller without sacrificing low-frequency capability. A subwoofer does not necessarily provide superior bass performance in comparison to large conventional loudspeakers on ordinary music recordings due to the typical lack of very low frequency content on such sources. However, there are recordings with substantial low-frequency content that most conventional loudspeakers are ill-equipped to handle without the help of a subwoofer, especially at high playback levels, such as music for pipe organs with 32-foot (9.75 meter) bass pipes (16 Hz), very large bass drums on symphony orchestra recordings and electronic music with extremely low synth bass parts, such as bass tests or bass songs.

Frequencies which are sufficiently low are not easily localized by humans, hence many stereo and multichannel audio systems feature only one subwoofer channel and a single subwoofer can be placed off-center without affecting the perceived sound stage, since the sound that it produces will be difficult to localize. The intention in a system with a subwoofer is often to use small main speakers (of which there are two for stereo and five or more for surround sound or movie tracks) and to hide the subwoofer elsewhere (e.g., behind furniture or under a table), or to augment an existing speaker to save it from having to handle woofer-destroying low frequencies at high levels. This effect is possible only if the subwoofer is restricted to quite low frequencies, usually taken to be, say, 100 Hz and below—still less localization is possible if restricted to even lower maximum frequencies. Higher upper limits for the subwoofer (e.g., 120 Hz) are much more easily localized, making a single subwoofer impractical. Home-cinema systems typically use one subwoofer cabinet (the "1" in 5.1 surround sound). However, to "improve bass distribution in a room that has multiple seating locations", and prevent nulls with dampened bass response, some home-cinema enthusiasts use 5.2- or 7.2- or 9.2-channel surround sound systems with two subwoofer cabinets in the same room.

Some users add a subwoofer because high levels of low-frequency bass are desired, even beyond what is in the original recording, as in the case of house music enthusiasts. Thus, subwoofers may be part of a package that includes satellite speakers, may be purchased separately, or may be built into the same cabinet as a conventional speaker system. For instance, some floor-standing tower speakers include a subwoofer driver in the lower portion of the same cabinet. Physical separation of subwoofer and satellite speakers not only allows placement in an inconspicuous location, but since sub-bass frequencies are particularly sensitive to room location (due to room resonances and reverberation 'modes'), the best position for the subwoofer is not likely to be where the satellite speakers are located.

Higher end home-cinema systems and enthusiasts may also opt to take low-frequency bass reproduction even further by incorporating two or more external subwoofers. Having two subwoofers placed around the room ensures even distribution of bass, reducing subwoofer localization and pressurizing the room with low frequency notes that can be felt, just like the cinemas.

For greatest efficiency and best coupling to the room's air volume, subwoofers can be placed in a corner of the room, far from large room openings, and closer to the listener. This is possible since low bass frequencies have a long wavelength; hence there is little difference between the information reaching a listener's left and right ears, and so they cannot be readily localized. All low-frequency information is sent to the subwoofer. However, unless the sound tracks have been carefully mixed for a single subwoofer channel, it is possible to have some cancellation of low frequencies if bass information in one channel's speaker is out of phase with another.

The physically separate subwoofer/satellite arrangement, with small satellite speakers and a large subwoofer cabinet that can be hidden behind furniture, has been popularized by multimedia speaker systems such as Bose Acoustimass Home Entertainment Systems, Polk Audio RM2008 Series and Klipsch Audio Technologies ProMedia, among many others.

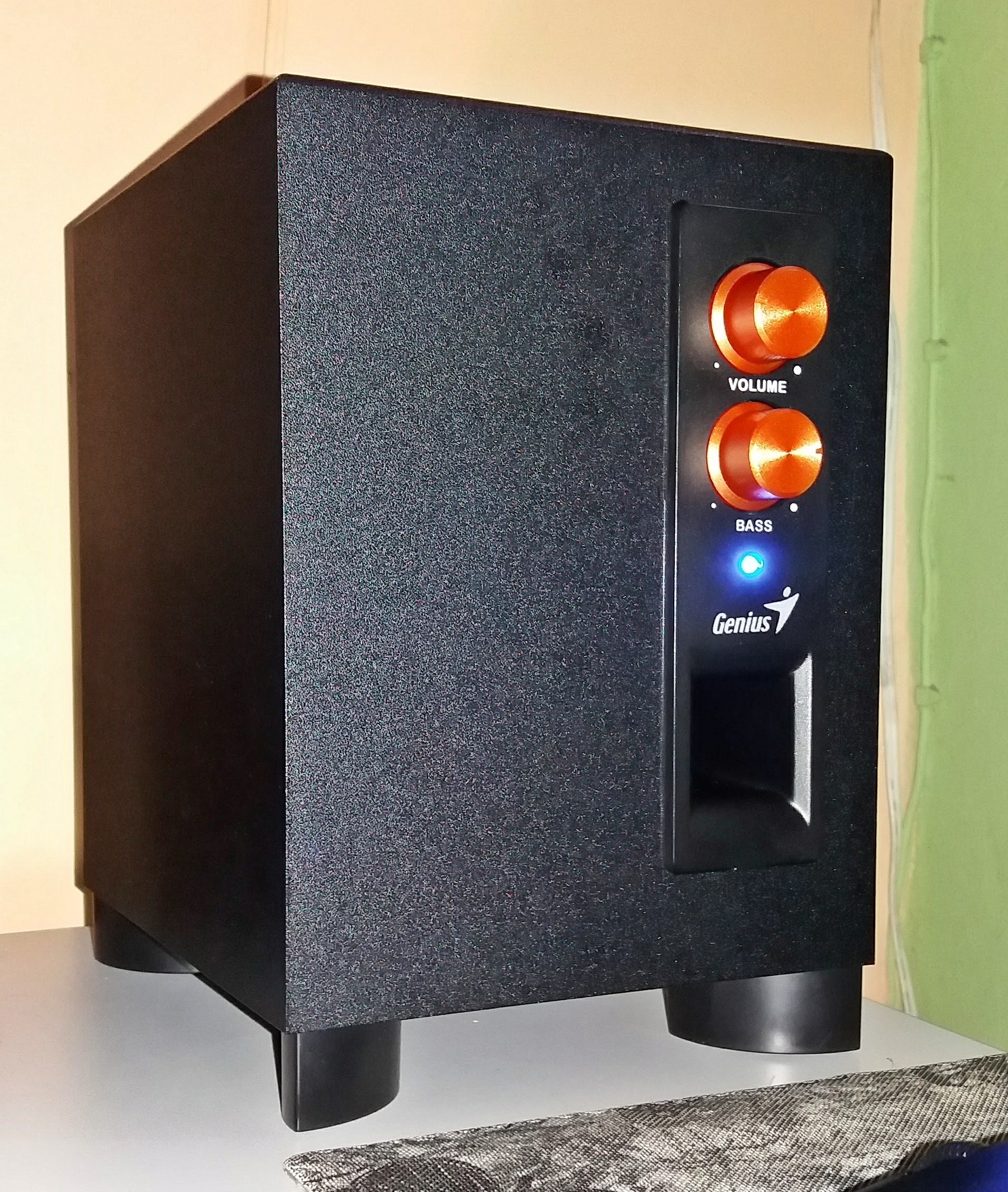
A small subwoofer cabinet designed for use with a home computer

Low-cost HTIB systems advertise their integration and simplicity. Particularly among lower-cost HTIB systems and with boomboxes, however, the inclusion of a subwoofer may be little more than a marketing technique. It is unlikely that a small woofer in an inexpensively built compact plastic cabinet will have better bass performance than well-designed conventional (and typically larger) speakers in a plywood or MDF cabinet. Mere use of the term "subwoofer" is no guarantee of good or extended bass performance. Many multimedia subwoofers might better be termed "mid-bass cabinets" (80 to 200 Hz), as they are too small to produce deep bass in the typical 20 to 100 Hz range.

Further, poorly designed systems often leave everything below about 120 Hz (or even higher) to the subwoofer, meaning that the subwoofer handles frequencies which the ear can use for sound source localization, thus introducing an undesirable subwoofer "localization effect". This is usually due to poor crossover designs or choices (too high a crossover point or insufficient crossover slope) used in many computer and home-cinema systems; localization also comes from port noise and from typically large amounts of harmonic distortion in the subwoofer design. Home subwoofers sold individually usually include crossover circuitry to assist with the integration of the subwoofer into an existing system.

=== Car audio ===
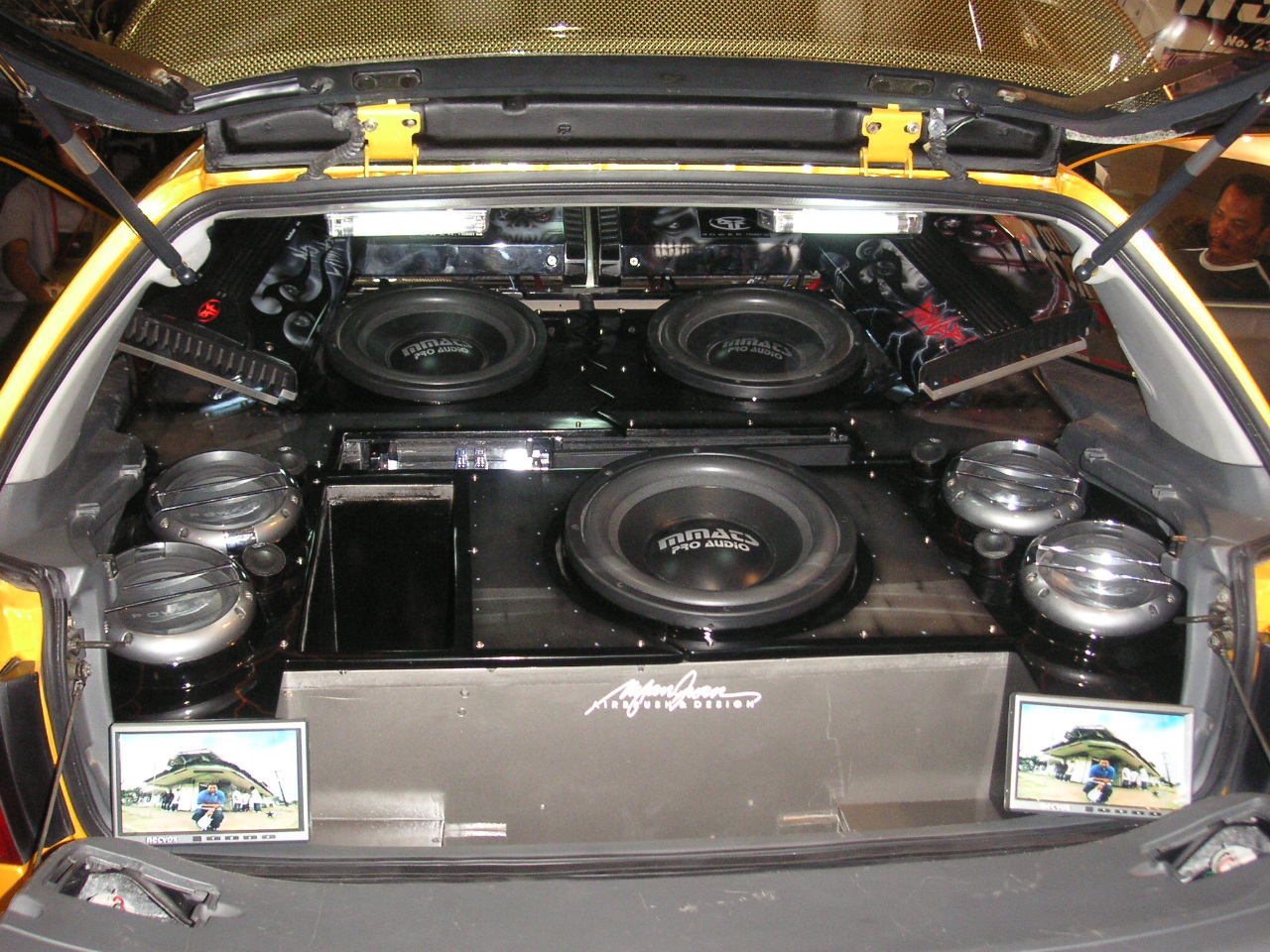
Multiple subwoofers in a hatchback car

Automobiles are not well suited for the "hidden" subwoofer approach due to space limitations in the passenger compartments. It is not possible, in most circumstances, to fit such large drivers and enclosures into doors or dashboards, so subwoofers are installed in the trunk or back seat space. This became a powerful reason behind teenager adoption. Having a vehicle with a system equipped with powerful subwoofers would become both, a source of pride for the owner and a nuisance for the rest of the people on the road. Some car audio enthusiasts compete to produce very high sound pressure levels in the confines of their vehicle's cabin; sometimes dangerously high sound pressure levels. At first, sound pressure levels ranging from 130 decibels and 150 decibels were common during the 1980s. When the 1990s rolled around, the 170 decibel barrier was broken. Today, readings higher than 180 decibels are common in sound pressure competitions. The "SPL wars" have drawn much attention to subwoofers in general, but subjective competitions in sound quality ("SQ") have not gained equivalent popularity. Top SPL cars are not able to play normal music, or perhaps even to drive normally as they are designed solely for competition. Many non-competition subwoofers are also capable of generating high levels in cars due to the small volume of a typical car interior. High sound levels can cause hearing loss and tinnitus if one is exposed to them for an extended period of time.

In the 2000s, several car audio manufacturers produced subwoofers using non-circular shapes, including Boston Acoustic, Kicker, Sony, Bazooka, and X-Tant. Other major car audio manufacturers like Rockford Fosgate did not follow suit since non-circular subwoofer shapes typically carry some sort of distortion penalties. In situations of limited mounting space they provide a greater cone area and assuming all other variables are constant, greater maximum output. An important factor in the "square sub vs round sub" argument is the effects of the enclosure used. In a sealed enclosure, the maximum displacement is determined by

$V_\mathrm{d} = x_\mathrm{max} \times S_\mathrm{d}$

where

- $V_\mathrm{d}$ is the volume of displacement (in m^{3})
- $x_\mathrm{max}$ is the amount of linear excursion the speaker is mechanically capable of (in m)
- $S_\mathrm{d}$ is the cone area of the subwoofer (in m^{2}).

These are some of the Thiele/Small parameters which can either be measured or found with the driver specifications.

=== Cinema sound ===
After the introduction of Sensurround, movie theater owners began installing permanent subwoofer systems. Dolby Stereo 70 mm Six Track was a six-channel film sound format introduced in 1976 that used two subwoofer channels for stereo reproduction of low frequencies. In 1981, Altec introduced a dedicated cinema subwoofer model tuned to around 20 Hz: the 8182. Starting in 1983, THX certification of the cinema sound experience quantified the parameters of good audio for watching films, including requirements for subwoofer performance levels and enough isolation from outside sounds so that noise did not interfere with the listening experience. This helped provide guidelines for multiplex cinema owners who wanted to isolate each individual cinema from its neighbors, even as louder subwoofers were making isolation more difficult. Specific cinema subwoofer models appeared from JBL, Electro-Voice, Eastern Acoustic Works, Kintek, Meyer Sound Laboratories and BGW Systems in the early 1990s. In 1992, Dolby Digital's six-channel film sound format incorporated a single LFE channel, the "point one" in 5.1 surround sound systems.

Tom Horral, a Boston-based acoustician, blames complaints about modern movies being too loud on subwoofers. He says that before subwoofers made it possible to have loud, relatively undistorted bass, movie sound levels were limited by the distortion in less capable systems at low frequency and high levels.

=== Sound reinforcement ===
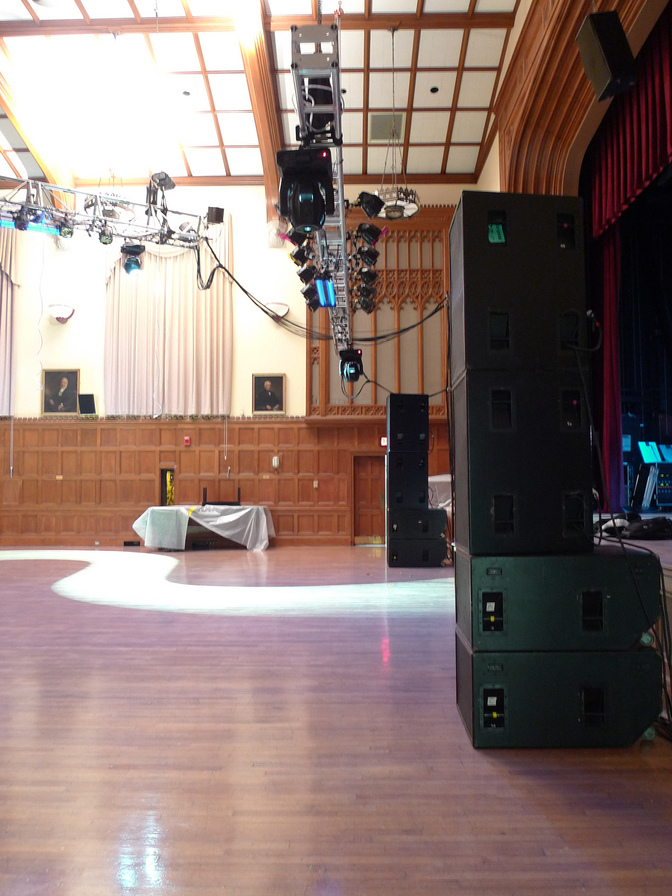
Each stack of speakers in this sound reinforcement setup consists of two EAW SB1000 slanted baffle subwoofers (each contains two 18-inch drivers) and two EAW KF850 full range cabinets for the mid and high frequencies.

Professional audio subwoofers used in rock concerts in stadia, DJ performances at dance music venues (e.g., electronic dance music) and similar events must be capable of very high bass output levels, at very low frequencies, with low distortion. This is reflected in the design attention given in the 2010s to the subwoofer applications for sound reinforcement, public address systems, dance club systems and concert systems. Cerwin-Vega states that when a subwoofer cabinet is added to an existing full-range speaker system, this is advantageous, as it moves the "...lowest frequencies from your main [full-range] PA speakers" thus "...eliminat[ing] a large amount of the excess work that your main top [full-range] box was trying to reproduce. As a result, your main [full-range] cabinets will run more efficiently and at higher volumes." A different argument for adding subwoofer cabinets is that they may increase the "level of clarity" and "perceived loudness" of an overall PA system, even if the SPL is not actually increased. Sound on Sound states that adding a subwoofer enclosure to a full-range system will reduce "cone excursion", thus lowering distortion, leading to an overall cleaner sound.

Consumer applications (as in home use) are considerably less demanding due to much smaller listening space and lower playback levels. Subwoofers are now almost universal in professional sound applications such as live concert sound, churches, nightclubs, and theme parks. Movie theaters certified to the THX standard for playback always include high-capability subwoofers. Some professional applications require subwoofers designed for very high sound levels, using multiple 12-, 15-, 18- or 21-inch drivers (30 cm, 40 cm, 45 cm, 53 cm respectively). Drivers as small as 10-inch (25 cm) are occasionally used, generally in horn-loaded enclosures.

The number of subwoofer enclosures used in a concert depends on a number of factors, including the size of the venue, whether it is indoors or outdoors, the amount of low-frequency content in the band's sound, the desired volume of the concert, and the design and construction of the enclosures (e.g., direct-radiating versus horn-loaded). A tiny coffeehouse may only need a single 10-inch subwoofer cabinet to augment the bass provided by the full-range speakers. A small bar may use one or two direct-radiating 15-inch (40 cm) subwoofer cabinets. A large dance club may have a row of four or five twin 18-inch (45 cm) subwoofer cabinets, or more. In the largest stadium venues, there may be a very large number of subwoofer enclosures. For example, the 2009–2010 U2 360° Tour used 24 Clair Brothers BT-218 subwoofers (a double 18-inch (45 cm) box) around the perimeter of the central circular stage, and 72 proprietary Clair Brothers cardioid S4 subwoofers placed underneath the ring-shaped "B" stage which encircles the central main stage.

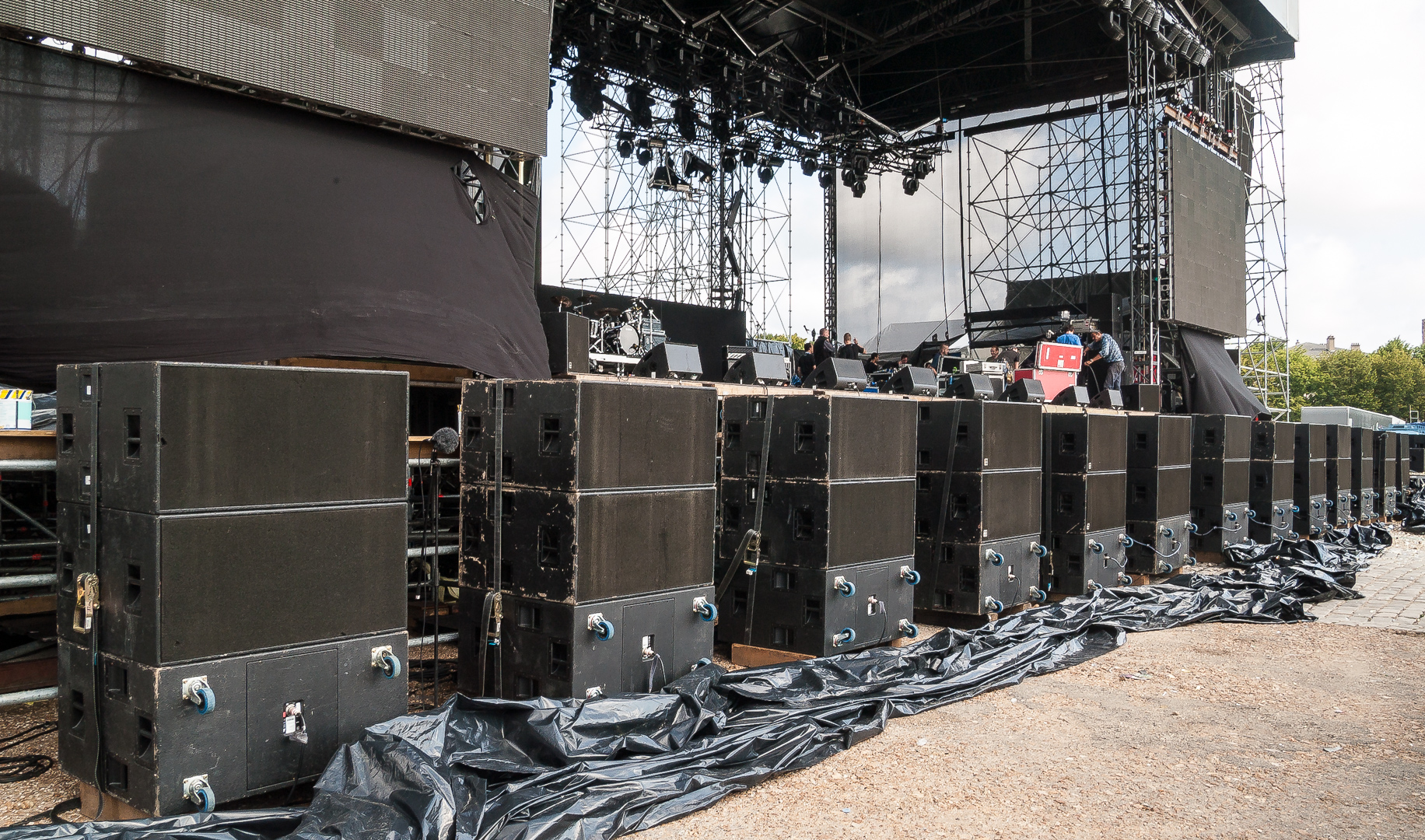
A row of subwoofer cabinets in front of the stage of a rock concert. One enclosure out of every stack of three is turned backward to make a cardioid output pattern.

The main speakers may be 'flown' from the ceiling of a venue on chain hoists, and 'flying points' (i.e. attachment points) are built into many professional loudspeaker enclosures. Subwoofers can be flown or stacked on the ground near the stage. One of the reasons subwoofers may be installed on the ground is that on-the-ground installation can increase the bass performance, particularly if the subwoofer is placed in the corner of a room (conversely, if a subwoofer cabinet is perceived as too loud, alternatives to on-the-ground or in-corner installation may be considered). There can be more than 50 double-18-inch (45 cm) cabinets in a typical rock concert system. Just as consumer subwoofer enclosures can be made of medium-density fibreboard (MDF), oriented strand board (OSB), plywood, plastic or other dense material, professional subwoofer enclosures can be built from the same materials. MDF is commonly used to construct subwoofers for permanent installations as its density is relatively high and weatherproofing is not a concern. Other permanent installation subwoofers have used very thick plywood: the Altec 8182 (1981) used 7-ply 28 mm birch-faced oak plywood. Touring subwoofers are typically built from 18–20 mm thick void-free Baltic birch (Betula pendula or Betula pubescens) plywood from Finland, Estonia or Russia; such plywood affords greater strength for frequently transported enclosures. Not naturally weatherproof, Baltic birch is coated with carpet, thick paint or spray-on truck bedliner to give the subwoofer enclosures greater durability.

Touring subwoofer cabinets are typically designed with features that facilitate moving the enclosure (e.g., wheels, a "towel bar" handle and recessed handles), a protective grille for the speaker (in direct radiating-style cabinets), metal or plastic protection for the cabinets to protect the finish as the cabinets are being slid one on top of another, and hardware to facilitate stacking the cabinets (e.g., interlocking corners) and for "flying" the cabinets from stage rigging. In the 2000s, many small- to mid-size subwoofers designed for bands' live sound use and DJ applications are "powered subs"; that is, they have an integrated power amplifier. These models typically have a built-in crossover. Some models have a metal-reinforced hole in which a speaker pole can be mounted for elevating full-frequency range cabinets.

==== Use in a full-range system ====
In professional concert sound system design, subwoofers can be incorporated seamlessly with the main speakers into a stereo or mono full-range system by using an active crossover. The audio engineer typically adjusts the frequency point at which lower frequency sounds are routed to the subwoofer speaker(s), and mid-frequency and higher frequency sounds are sent to the full-range speakers. Such a system receives its signal from the main mono or stereo mixing console mix bus and amplifies all frequencies together in the desired balance. If the main sound system is stereo, the subwoofers can also be in stereo. Otherwise, a mono subwoofer channel can be derived within the crossover from a stereo mix, depending on the crossover make and model. While 2010-era subwoofer cabinet manufacturers suggest placing subwoofers on either side of a stage (as implied by the inclusion of pole cups for the full-range PA cabinets), Dave Purton argues that for club gigs, having two subwoofer cabinets on either side of a stage will lead to gaps in bass coverage in the venue; he states that putting the two subwoofer cabinets together will create a more even, omnidirectional sub-bass tone.

PA systems by size and subwoofer approach
PA system set-up	Venue size
Small system: Two pole-mounted mid/high frequency PA speaker cabinets and two small subwoofer cabinets with 15- or 18-inch subwoofers (Note: this would be used in club where jazz, acoustic music, country music or soft rock is played)	Small club with capacity for up to 300 people
Small high amplifier power system: Two high amplifier power-rated mid/high frequency PA speakers with 15-inch woofers and a large horn-loaded tweeter; two high amplifier power-rated subwoofer cabinets with one or two 18-inch subwoofer cabs (front-firing, also known as "front loaded", or manifold-loaded subwoofer cabinets)	Small club with capacity for up to 500 people
Mid-size PA system: Four larger multi-woofer mid/high-frequency PA speaker cabinets (e.g., each with two 15-inch woofers) and four subwoofer cabinets, either front-firing, manifold-loaded or a folded horn	Large clubs with capacity for 500+ people, small music festivals, fairs
Large-size PA system: Multiple mid/high-frequency PA speakers, possibly "flown" up high in rigging, and a number of subwoofer cabinets (either front firing, manifold loaded or folded horn)	Large venues with capacity for 1000+ people, larger music festivals

==== Aux-fed subwoofers ====
Instead of being incorporated into a full-range system, concert subwoofers can be supplied with their own signal from a separate mix bus on the mixing console; often one of the auxiliary sends ("aux" or "auxes") is used. This configuration is called "aux-fed subwoofers", and has been observed to significantly reduce low-frequency "muddiness" that can build up in a concert sound system which has on stage a number of microphones each picking up low frequencies and each having different phase relationships of those low frequencies. The aux-fed subwoofers method greatly reduces the number of sources feeding the subwoofers to include only those instruments that have desired low-frequency information; sources such as kick drum, bass guitar, samplers and keyboard instruments. This simplifies the signal sent to the subwoofers and makes for greater clarity and low punch. Aux-fed subwoofers can even be stereo, if desired, using two auxiliary mix buses.

==== Directional bass ====
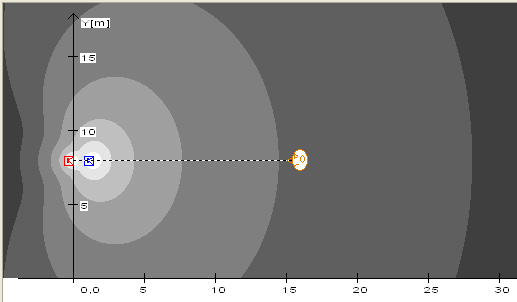
Cardioid dispersion pattern of two end-fire subwoofers placed one in front of the other. The signal feeding the enclosure nearest the listener is delayed by a few milliseconds. (Note: Cardioid subwoofer image: The second subwoofer has been delayed a precise amount corresponding to the time it takes sound to traverse the distance between speaker grilles. Image captured from Electro-Voice's RACE loudspeaker pattern prediction software. Frequency shown is 60 Hz.)

To keep low-frequency sound focused on the audience area and not on the stage, and to keep low frequencies from bothering people outside of the event space, a variety of techniques have been developed in concert sound to turn the naturally omnidirectional radiation of subwoofers into a more directional pattern. Several examples of sound reinforcement system applications where sound engineers seek to provide more directional bass sound are: music festivals, which often have several bands performing at the same time on different stages; large raves or EDM events, where there are multiple DJs performing at the same time in different rooms or stages; and multiplex movie theaters, in which there are many films being shown simultaneously in auditoriums that share common walls. These techniques include: setting up subwoofers in a vertical array; using combinations of delay and polarity inversion; and setting up a delay-shaded system. With a cardioid dispersion pattern, two end-fire subwoofers can be placed one in front of the other. The enclosure nearest the listener is delayed by a few milliseconds. The second subwoofer is delayed a precise amount corresponding to the time it takes sound to traverse the distance between speaker grilles.

===== Vertical array =====
Stacking or rigging the subwoofers in a vertical array focuses the low frequencies forward to a greater or lesser extent depending on the physical length of the array. Longer arrays have a more directional effect at lower frequencies. The directionality is more pronounced in the vertical dimension, yielding a radiation pattern that is wide but not tall. This helps reduce the amount of low-frequency sound bouncing off the ceiling indoors and assists in mitigating external noise complaints outdoors.

===== Rear delay array =====
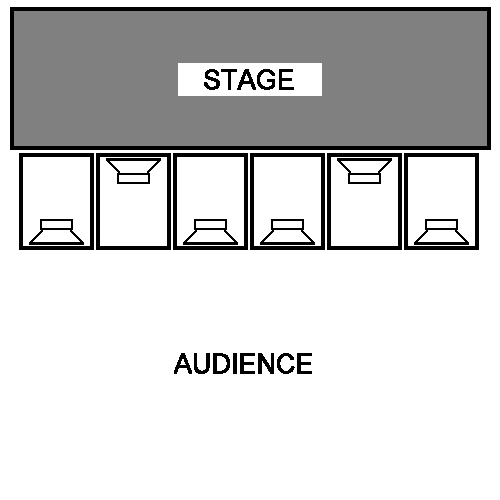
CSA: Six subwoofers arranged for less bass energy on stage. Signal going to the reversed enclosures is delayed a few milliseconds.

Another cardioid subwoofer array pattern can be used horizontally, one which takes few channels of processing and no change in required physical space. This method is often called "cardioid subwoofer array" or "CSA" even though the pattern of all directional subwoofer methods is cardioid. The CSA method reverses the enclosure orientation and inverts the polarity of one out of every three subwoofers across the front of the stage, and delays those enclosures for maximum cancellation of the target frequency on stage. Polarity inversion can be implemented electronically, by reversing the wiring polarity, or by physically positioning the enclosure to face rearward. This method reduces forward output relative to a tight-packed, flat-fronted array of subwoofers, but can solve problems of unwanted low-frequency energy coming into microphones on stage. Compared to the end-fire array, this method has less on-axis energy but more even pattern control throughout the audience, and more predictable cancellation rearward. The effect spans a range of slightly more than one octave.

A second method of rear delay array combines end-fire topology with polarity reversal, using two subwoofers positioned front to back, the drivers spaced one-quarter wavelength apart, the rear enclosure inverted in polarity and delayed by a few milliseconds for maximum cancellation on stage of the target frequency. This method has the least output power directed toward the audience, compared to other directional methods.

===== End-fire array =====
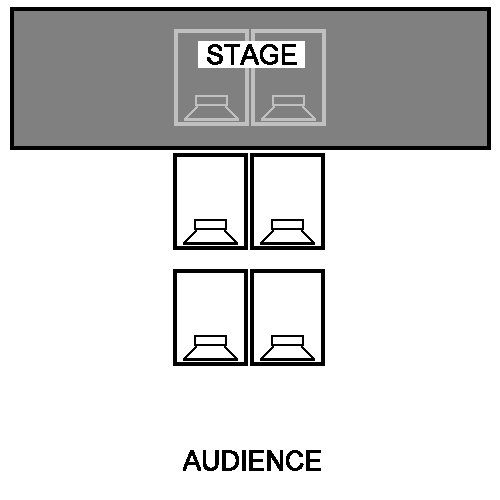
End-fire array using three rows of subwoofers. Each row is delayed a few milliseconds more than the previous row.

The end-fire subwoofer method, also called "forward steered arrays", places subwoofer drivers co-axially in one or more rows, using destructive interference to reduce emissions to the sides and rear. This can be done with separate subwoofer enclosures positioned front to back with a spacing between them of one-quarter wavelength of the target frequency, the frequency that is least wanted on stage or most desired in the audience. Each row is delayed beyond the first row by an amount related to the speed of sound in air; the delay is typically a few milliseconds. The arrival time of sound energy from all the subwoofers is near-simultaneous from the audience's perspective, but is canceled out to a large degree behind the subwoofers because of offset sound wave arrival times. Directionality of the target frequency can achieve as much as 25 dB rear attenuation, and the forward sound is coherently summed in line with the subwoofers. The positional technique of end-fire subwoofers came into widespread use in European live concert sound in 2006.

The end-fire array trades a few decibels of output power for directionality, so it requires more enclosures for the same output power as a tight-packed, flat-fronted array of enclosures. Sixteen enclosures in four rows were used in 2007 at one of the stages of the Ultra Music Festival, to reduce low-frequency interference to neighboring stages. Because of the physical size of the end-fire array, few concert venues are able to implement it. The output pattern suffers from comb-filtering off-axis, but can be further shaped by adjusting the frequency response of each row of subwoofers.

===== Delay-shaded array =====
A long line of subwoofers placed horizontally along the front edge of the stage can be delayed such that the center subwoofers fire several milliseconds prior to the ones flanking them, which fire several milliseconds prior to their neighbors, continuing in this fashion until the last subwoofers are reached at the outside ends of the subwoofer row (beamforming). This method helps to counteract the extreme narrowing of the horizontal dispersion pattern seen with a horizontal subwoofer array. Such delay shading can be used to virtually reshape a loudspeaker array.

===== Directional enclosure =====
Some subwoofer enclosure designs rely on drivers facing to the sides or to the rear in order to achieve a degree of directionality. End-fire drivers can be positioned within a single enclosure that houses more than one driver.

=== Variants ===
Some less commonly used bass enclosures are variants of the subwoofer enclosure's normal range, such as the upper-bass cabinet (80–200 Hz) and the infrasonic (extra low) subwoofer (below 20 Hz).

=== Enclosure designs ===
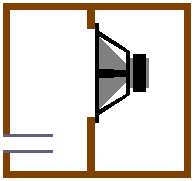
Compound or 4th-order band-pass enclosure

Front-loaded subwoofers have one or more subwoofer speakers in a cabinet, typically with a grille to protect the speakers. In practice, many front-loaded subwoofer cabinets have a vent or port in the speaker cabinet, thus creating a bass reflex enclosure. Even though a bass reflex port or vent creates some additional phase delay, it adds SPL, which is often a key factor in PA and sound reinforcement system applications. As such, non-vented front-firing subwoofer cabinets are rare in pro audio applications.

Horn-loaded subwoofers have a subwoofer speaker that has a pathway following the loudspeaker. To save space, the pathway is often folded, so that the folded pathway will fit into a box-style cabinet. Cerwin-Vega states that its folded horn subwoofer cabinets, "...on average, produce 6 dB more output at 1 watt than a dual 18[-inch] vented box" giving "four times the output with half the number of drivers". The Cerwin-Vega JE-36C has a five feet long folded horn chamber length in the wooden cabinet.

Manifold subwoofers have two or more subwoofer speakers that feed the throat of a single horn. This increases SPL for the subwoofer, at the cost of increased distortion. EV has a manifold speaker cabinet in which four drivers are mounted as close together as practical. This is a different design than the "multiple drivers in one throat" approach. An unusual example of manifold subwoofer design is the Thomas Mundorf (TM) approach of having four subwoofers facing each other and sitting close together, which is used for theater in the round shows, where the audience surrounds the performers in a big circle (e.g., Metallica has used this in some concerts). The TM approach produces an omnidirectional bass sound. Cerwin-Vega defines a manifold enclosure as one in which "...the driver faces into a tuned ported cavity. You hear sound directly from the back of the driver in addition to the sound that emanates out of the port. This type of enclosure design extends the frequency capability of the driver lower than it would reproduce by itself."

Bandpass subwoofers have a sealed cabinet within another cabinet, with the "outer" cabinet typically having a vent or port.

=== Bass instrument amplification ===
In rare cases, sound reinforcement subwoofer enclosures are also used for bass instrument amplification by electric bass players and synth bass players. For most bands and most small- to mid-size venues (e.g., nightclubs and bars), standard bass guitar speaker enclosures or keyboard amplifiers will provide sufficient sound pressure levels for onstage monitoring. Since a regular electric bass has a low "E" (41 Hz) as its lowest note, most standard bass guitar cabinets are only designed with a range that goes down to about 40 Hz. However, in some cases, performers wish to have extended sub-bass response that is not available from standard instrument speaker enclosures, so they use subwoofer cabinets. Just as some electric guitarists add huge stacks of guitar cabinets mainly for show, some bassists will add immense subwoofer cabinets with 18-inch woofers mainly for show, and the extension subwoofer cabinets will be operated at a lower volume than the main bass cabinets.

Bass guitar players who may use subwoofer cabinets include performers who play with extended range basses that include a low "B" string (about 31 Hz), bassists who play in styles where a very powerful sub-bass response is an important part of the sound (e.g., funk, Latin, gospel, R & B, etc.), and/or bass players who perform in stadium-size venues or large outdoor venues. Keyboard players who use subwoofers for on-stage monitoring include electric organ players who use bass pedal keyboards (which go down to a low "C" which is about 33 Hz) and synth bass players who play rumbling sub-bass parts that go as low as 18 Hz. Of all of the keyboard instruments that are amplified onstage, synthesizers can produce some of the lowest pitches, because unlike a traditional electric piano or electric organ, which have as their lowest notes a low "A" and a low "C", respectively, a synth does not have a fixed lowest octave. A synth player can add lower octaves to a patch by pressing an "octave down" button, which can produce pitches that are at the limits of human hearing.

Several concert sound subwoofer manufacturers suggest that their subs can be used for bass instrument amplification. Meyer Sound suggests that its 650-R2 Concert Series Subwoofer, a 14-square-foot (1.3 m^{2}) enclosure with two 18-inch drivers (45 cm), can be used for bass instrument amplification. While performers who use concert sound subwoofers for onstage monitoring may like the powerful sub-bass sound that they get onstage, sound engineers may find the use of large subwoofers (e.g., two 18-inch drivers (45 cm)) for onstage instrument monitoring to be problematic, because it may interfere with the "Front of House" sub-bass sound.

== Bass shakers ==
Since infrasonic bass is felt, sub-bass can be augmented using tactile transducers. Unlike a typical subwoofer driver, which produces audible vibrations, tactile transducers produce low-frequency vibrations that are designed to be felt by individuals who are touching the transducer or indirectly through a piece of furniture or a wooden floor. Tactile transducers have recently emerged as a device class, called variously "bass shakers", "butt shakers" and "throne shakers". They are attached to a seat, for instance a drummer's stool ("throne") or gamer's chair, car seat or home-cinema seating, and the vibrations of the driver are transmitted to the body then to the ear in a manner similar to bone conduction. They connect to an amplifier like a normal subwoofer. They can be attached to a large flat surface (for instance a floor or platform) to create a large low- frequency conduction area, although the transmission of low frequencies through the feet is not as efficient as through the seat.

The advantage of tactile transducers used for low frequencies is that they allow a listening environment that is not filled with loud low-frequency sound waves in the air. This helps the drummer in a rock music band to monitor their kick drum performance without filling the stage with powerful, loud low-frequency sound from a 15-inch (40 cm) subwoofer monitor and an amplifier, which can "leak" into other drum mics and lower the quality of the sound mix. By not having a large, powerful subwoofer monitor, a bass shaker also enables a drummer to lower the sound pressure levels that they are exposed to during a performance, reducing the risk of hearing damage. For home cinema or video game use, bass shakers help the user avoid disturbing others in nearby apartments or rooms, because even powerful sound effects such as explosion sounds in a war video game or the simulated rumbling of an earthquake in an adventure film will not be heard by others. However, some critics argue that the felt vibrations are disconnected from the auditory experience, and they claim that that music is less satisfying with the "butt shaker" than sound effects. As well, critics have claimed that the bass shaker itself can rattle during loud sound effects, which can distract the listener.

== World record claims ==
With varying measures upon which to base claims, several subwoofers have been said to be the world's largest, loudest or lowest.

=== Matterhorn ===
The Matterhorn is a subwoofer model completed in March 2007 by Danley Sound Labs in Gainesville, Georgia after a U.S. military request for a loudspeaker that could project infrasonic waves over a distance. The Matterhorn was designed to reproduce a continuous sine wave from 15 to 20 Hz, and generate 94 dB at a distance of 250 meters (820 ft), and more than 140 dB for music playback measured at the horn mouth. It can generate a constant 15 Hz sine wave tone at 140 dB for 24 hours a day, seven days a week with extremely low harmonic distortion. The subwoofer has a flat frequency response from 15 to 100 Hz, and is down 3 dB at 12 Hz. It was built within an intermodal container 20 feet (6.1 m) long and 8 by 8 feet (2.4 m × 2.4 m) square. The container doors swing open to reveal a tapped horn driven by 40 long-throw 15-inch (40 cm) MTX speaker drivers each powered by its own 1000-watt amplifier. The manufacturer claims that 53 13-ply 18 mm 4-by-8-foot (1.2 m × 2.4 m) sheets of plywood were used in its construction, although one of the fabricators wrote that double-thickness 26-ply sheets were used for convenience.

A diesel generator is housed within the enclosure to supply electricity when external power is unavailable. At the annual National Systems Contractors Association (NSCA) convention in March 2007, the Matterhorn was barred from making any loud demonstrations of its power because of concerns about damaging the building of the Orange County Convention Center. Instead, using only a single 20 amp electrical circuit for safety, visitors were allowed to step inside the horn of the subwoofer for an "acoustic massage" as the fractionally powered Matterhorn reproduced low level 10–15 Hz waves.

=== Royal Device custom installation ===
Another subwoofer claimed to be the world's biggest is a custom installation in Italy made by Royal Device primarily of bricks, concrete and sound-deadening material consisting of two subwoofers embedded in the foundation of a listening room. The horn-loaded subwoofers each have a floor mouth that is 2.2 square meters (24 sq ft), and a horn length that is 9.5 meters (31 ft), in a cavity 1 meter (3 ft 3 in) under the floor of the listening room. Each subwoofer is driven by eight 18-inch subwoofer drivers with 100 millimeters (3.9 in) voice coils. The designers assert that the floor mouths of the horns are additionally loaded acoustically by a vertical wooden horn expansion and the room's ceiling to create a 10 Hz "full power" wave at the listening position.

=== Concept Design 60-inch ===
A single 60-inch (1,500 mm) diameter subwoofer driver was designed by Richard Clark and David Navone with the help of Eugene Patronis of the Georgia Institute of Technology. The driver was intended to break sound pressure level records when mounted in a road vehicle, calculated to be able to achieve more than 180 dBSPL. It was built in 1997, driven by DC motors connected to a rotary crankshaft somewhat like in a piston engine. The cone diameter was 54 inches (1,400 mm) and was held in place with a 3-inch (76 mm) surround. With a 6-inch (150 mm) peak-to-peak stroke, it created a one-way air displacement of 6,871 cubic inches (112,600 cm^{3}). It was capable of generating 5–20 Hz sine waves at various DC motor speeds—not as a response to audio signal—it could not play music. The driver was mounted in a stepvan owned by Tim Maynor but was too powerful for the amount of applied reinforcement and damaged the vehicle. MTX's Loyd Ivey helped underwrite the project and the driver was then called the MTX "Thunder 1000000" (one million).

Still unfinished, the vehicle was entered in an SPL competition in 1997 at which a complaint was lodged against the computer control of the DC motor. Instead of using the controller, two leads were touched together in the hope that the motor speed was set correctly. The drive shaft broke after one positive stroke which created an interior pressure wave of 162 dB. The Concept Design 60-inch was not shown in public after 1998.

=== MTX Jackhammer ===
The heaviest production subwoofer intended for use in automobiles is the MTX Jackhammer by MTX Audio, which features a 22-inch (560 mm) diameter cone. The Jackhammer has been known to take upwards of 6000 watts sent to a dual voice coil moving within a 900-ounce (26 kg) strontium ferrite magnet. The Jackhammer weighs in at 369 pounds (167 kg) and has an aluminum heat sink. The Jackhammer has been featured on the reality TV show Pimp My Ride.

== See also ==
- 7.1 surround sound
- Bass management
- Full-range speaker
- Mid-range speaker
- Power alley
- Rotary woofer
- Super tweeter
- Thiele/Small
- Tweeter
- Woofer
