= BGW Systems =

U.S. audio power amplifier company

BGW Systems, Inc.
- Company type: Private
- Industry: Audio electronics, Sheet metal, Computer systems
- Founded: 1971; 55 years ago, in Hawthorne, California
- Founder: Brian Gary Wachner
- Headquarters: Montebello, California, United States
- Products: Model 750 series and Grand Touring series power amplifiers
- Owner: Amplifier Technologies, Inc.
- Website: http://www.bgw.com/

BGW Systems, Inc. is a designer and manufacturer of audio power amplifiers based in Southern California in the United States. The company also manufactures other audio electronics designs as well as computer systems and sheet metal products.

== History ==
Founded by Brian Gary Wachner in 1971 in his garage while he was employed as a field applications engineer for National Semiconductor, BGW scored its first major success in 1974 when Universal Studios selected BGW to supply thousands of Model 750 and 750A amplifiers for its Sensurround cinema subwoofer sound effects systems. Following the positive industry exposure from Sensurround, BGW amps began to be installed permanently in many movie theaters as well as at theme parks and nightclubs. By 1978, BGW amplifiers were installed in greater numbers in discothèques than any other amplifier.

Original BGW logo.

Wachner co-wrote a paper for the Audio Engineering Society (AES) in 1975, addressing the problem of differing power claims in the amplifier industry and the hope that power rating standards set by the Federal Trade Commission would narrow the 'credibility gap'.

BGW introduced an audio crossover product in 1979 and new amplifier lines in '80 and '82. By 1983, BGW's skill in sheet metal work (acquired in fabricating their substantial amplifier housings) had grown to the point of it becoming its own source of company revenue. BGW began supplying finished metal products to a number of industries, and established a BGW-branded "Rack and Roll" line of 19-inch rack hardware in 1991.

In 1985, Wachner delivered a paper to the AES regarding guidelines for power amplifier evaluation.

1987 saw the introduction of the Grand Touring series of amplifiers, beginning with the GTA. Its successor, the GTB, came out the next year. This model line, designed for the road and known for its rugged durability and conservative power rating, was adopted by many concert sound companies, some of whom became BGW dealers. Wachner himself visited these dealers, flying around the United States in his private airplane to meet them. His interaction with the sound reinforcement system company owners and operators led to Wachner's work on signal processing in conjunction with amplifier power in order to achieve flat power response in multi-band sound systems; a paper given to AES in May 1988.

BGW Systems is used as an example in a guidebook for companies seeking Small Business Administration loans. In 1991, BGW applied for and received a loan of US$200,000 in order to extend sales internationally. By 1995, 60% of BGW's sales were from outside the US.

In 1992, the BGW U86 rack-mounted computer was introduced as an entirely new product line. At the same time, the Universal Chassis product was introduced from the sheet metal department.

THX gave their approval to the BGW M2200 self-powered subwoofer introduced in 1993. The subwoofer contained four 15" drivers, crossover circuitry, and an internal amplifier based on the Grand Touring series design. THX quality assurance also approved the BGW M1100 subwoofer (basically half of an M2200) in 1995 and the Millennium amplifier line in 1996.

BGW's prominence and Wachner's involvement in the industry led to the Los Angeles section of AES asking Wachner to chair the section for two years.

Brian Gary Wachner died of an aggressive cancer on October 22, 1997 at the age of 52. His widow, Barbara Wachner, had been deeply involved in company operations since its founding; she assumed the position of company president. Their son, Jeff Wachner, became the primary public contact for BGW.

Steve Lyle joined BGW in 2000, taking over as chief engineer.

== Present ==
On October 20, 2003, the Wachners sold BGW Systems to Amplifier Technologies, Inc. of Montebello, California. Under ATI, BGW has introduced several new amplifier designs but has reduced its industry profile; BGW's last appearance at an industry trade show was at the NAMM Show in January, 2003.

Though several of BGW's products met THX quality assurance standards in the mid-1990s extending through to 2002, BGW is no longer represented on THX product listings.
