= Fanfare (magazine) =

American classical and jazz review magazine

- Editor: Joel Bruce Flegler
- Categories: Classical music
- Frequency: bimonthly
- Circulation: 8,000 (2012)
- Publisher: Joel Bruce Flegler
- First issue: 1 September 1977
- Company: Fanfare, Inc. a New Jersey corporation
- Country: United States
- Based in: Tenafly, New Jersey
- Language: English
- Website: www.fanfaremag.com
- ISSN: 0148-9364

Fanfare is an American bimonthly magazine devoted to reviewing recorded music in all playback formats. It mainly covers classical music, but since inception, has also featured a jazz column in every issue.

== History and profile ==
Fanfare was founded on 1 September 1977 "as a labor of love" by an elementary-school teacher turned editor named Joel Bruce Flegler (born 1941). After 49 years, he is still the publisher.

The magazine now runs to over 600 pages in a 6 in × 9 in (150 mm × 230 mm) format with about 80% of the editorial copy devoted to record reviews, and a front section with a substantial number of interviews and feature articles. It avoids equipment and pop music coverage, and includes reviews of more classical releases than most similar magazines.

Subscriptions include online access to current content and archives of past issues.
