= Voigt (disambiguation) =

Voigt is a suname.

Voigt may also refer to:

- The Voigt profile, a peak function
- The Voigt pipe, a type of loudspeaker
- Voigt notation, a way to represent a symmetric tensor

== See also ==
- Kelvin–Voigt material
