= Voigt pipe =

The Voigt pipe is a type of loudspeaker enclosure that embodies a combination of transmission line, ported enclosure and horn characteristics. It is highly regarded by some speaker designers, as evidenced by established manufacturers such as Castle. Due to its relatively high efficiency the design is frequently employed in full-range loudspeaker designs.

The concept is that the sound emitted from the rear of the loudspeaker driver is progressively reflected and absorbed along the length of the tapering tube, almost completely preventing internally reflected sound being re-transmitted through the cone of the loudspeaker. The lower part of the pipe acts as a horn while the top can be visualized as an extended compression chamber. The entire pipe can also be seen as a tapered transmission line in inverted form, that is, widening rather than narrowing from top to bottom. The driver is usually positioned close to the middle of the baffle or slightly lower. Its relatively low adoption in commercial speakers can mostly be attributed to the large resulting dimensions of the speaker produced and the expense of manufacturing a rigid tapering tube.

The Voigt pipe was designed in 1934 by Paul G. A. H. Voigt Paul Gustavus Adolphus Helmuth Voigt and is also referred to as a tapered quarter-wave pipe (TQWP) or tapered quarter-wave tube (TQWT).

== See also ==
- Audiophile
- Frequency response
- High-end audio
- List of loudspeaker manufacturers
- Loudspeaker acoustics
- Loudspeaker measurement
- Acoustic transmission line
