= Midwoofer-tweeter-midwoofer =

Loudspeaker configuration

The midwoofer-tweeter-midwoofer loudspeaker configuration (called MTM, for short) was a design arrangement from the late 1960s that suffered from serious lobing issues that prevented its popularity until it was perfected by Joseph D'Appolito as a way of correcting the inherent lobe tilting of a typical mid-tweeter (MT) configuration, at the crossover frequency, unless time-aligned. In the MTM arrangement the loudspeaker uses three drivers: Two mid-range (or mid-woofer/woofer) for the low frequencies and a tweeter for the higher frequencies, with the tweeter being placed between the mid-range drivers (as shown in the second image below). D'Appolito initially configured his design using a 3rd order (18 dB/oct or 60 dB/dec) crossover, D'Appolito has since amended this original recommendation in favor of 4th order topology. However, this does not impart any significant effect on the MTM design's unique characteristics.

There are speakers where the tweeter appears below the larger driver and though electrically it is identical to the MT configuration, it is customarily denoted as "TM". The only other difference is the lobe tilt which is exactly the opposite of the MT configuration.

The direction in which the lobe tilts (i.e., the vertical orientation or angle of the lobe) is a function of the difference or offset between the acoustic centers of the two drivers.

== Lobe tilting of MT or TM configurations ==
Since it is rare for a tweeter and mid-range (or woofer) to have their diaphragms or acoustic centers in the same physical plane, it follows that sound waves emitted by them (of the same frequency) will not reach a particular listening position in the on-axis plane at the same time. Conversely, the MT or TM combination's on-axis plane is not coincident with the physical on-axis plane - it is tilted w.r.t. the physical plane. The overall effect is that at the crossover frequency (when both drivers are reproducing the same frequency) the sound from both drivers does not acoustically sum ideally at the on-axis listening position. There will, however, be some off-axis listening position where the acoustic sum is ideal - but the listening position itself may be such that it is not practical. Thus, with a typical TM or MT loudspeaker where the drivers are not time-aligned, the main lobe is tilted away from the horizontal.

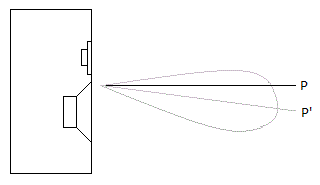

The above image shows the lobing pattern of a typical TM loudspeaker. As can be seen, the lobe tilts downwards towards P' which is not the same as the on-axis listening position P.

This is one of the reasons for physically offsetting the mid-range and tweeter such that the tweeter is physically behind the mid-range, or tilting the speaker upwards, to achieve an on-axis response that is coincident with the physical on-axis plane. This process is known as time-alignment. Other ways to time-align are to introduce a phase shift in the tweeter signal (lag or lead, depending upon the offset between the drivers) so that it mimics the physical offset. All these methods, however require some amount of measurement and effort to get right.

== The MTM alternative ==
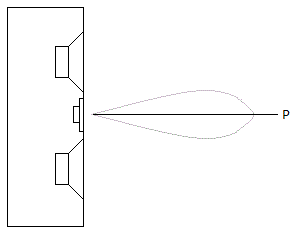

When another mid-range or midwoofer is added vertically and symmetrically opposite to the existing one, the result is that the tilted on-axis plane gets corrected such that the differences between the midwoofer and tweeter planes become immaterial - the on-axis plane is always w.r.t. the tweeter's center. This of course requires that the two midwoofers are in exactly the same plane, and exactly the same distance from the tweeter - which is much easier to do physically. There is however a price to pay for this - although the MTM's on-axis response is near perfect, its radiation pattern or main lobe is much narrower than that of the MT or TM configuration's. As a result, the off-axis response (i.e., response at locations vertically away from exactly opposite the tweeter) is much weaker and there can be obvious and discernible change in tonality at the crossover as one's listening height relative to the tweeter changes, and the effect is perceived more as the listener moves closer to the loudspeaker. This is corrected by (1) mounting the midwoofers as close to the tweeters as possible (so that the listening distance is much larger than the distance between the drivers) and (2) operating the midwoofers and tweeter in quadrature, i.e., achieved by ensuring that the tweeter lags the midwoofer by 90° in phase at the crossover frequency, and this in turn can be achieved if the crossover has a 3rd order Butterworth characteristic. To achieve the smallest distance between the mids and tweeters requires the drivers to have the smallest possible size - but there are design limitations to this (lowest mid-range frequency, for example, will place a lower limit to the mid's diameter).

Another problem with the MTM configuration is the interaction between the two midwoofers. For any frequency (over the operating range of the midwoofers), the off-axis response exhibits different lobing patterns because of the vertical distance between the midwoofers, and as a function of the frequency and horizontal distance from the speaker. At any off-axis listening position, although both midwoofers operate in phase (are time-aligned), the waves from each reach the listening position at different times (and therefore have a relative phase difference) - at frequencies where the time displacement between the two midwoofers corresponds to one-half of one wavelength, the outputs of the two midwoofers will null. However, the time displacement itself is a function of the distance from the speaker and frequency, which means that the lobing for a given listening distance and off-axis position will be different at different frequencies. Since the basic reason for this is the distance between the midwoofers, again the solution is to use as small drivers as possible, placed as close as possible. With this, for listening distances much greater than the distance between the drivers the lobing effects are much less obvious.

== See also ==
- Audio crossover
- Acoustic lobing
- Loudspeaker time alignment
