= Donald Leslie =

American musician (1911–2004)

Donald James Leslie
- Born: April 13, 1911; Danville, Illinois, United States
- Died: September 2, 2004 (aged 93); Altadena, California, United States
- Occupations: Inventor of Leslie Speaker; Audio Engineer

Donald James Leslie (April 13, 1911 – September 2, 2004) was an American inventor best known for the Leslie speaker and its distinctive effect commonly used with the Hammond organ which helped popularize electronic instruments.

== Biography ==
Leslie was born on April 13, 1911 in Danville, Illinois. His father was Benjamin Franklin Leslie, and his mother was Lucy Keller Leslie. His family moved to Glendale, California in 1913, where Leslie attended school, graduating from Glendale Union High School in 1929. He was very interested in piano and pipe organ music.

Leslie learned about mechanics, electronics, and radios while working various jobs, and by the mid-1930s he was working at Barker Bros. in Los Angeles as a radio service engineer. Barker Bros. sold and repaired the newly-introduced Hammond organs, and Leslie bought one in 1937, hoping it would be a suitable substitute for a pipe organ. When he heard the organ's sound in his home compared with the spacious showroom where he originally heard it, he was disappointed. To Leslie's ear, in a confined space the sound had no resonance, and the pure electronic oscillators sounded "dull, shrill, and still."

He set out to design an organ speaker to remedy this problem, experimenting with various designs over the next four years, and eventually concluding that a design that combined a fixed speaker with a rotating baffle chamber inside its cabinet, which produced a tremolo effect with a variation in pitch, producing a sequence of frequency modulated sidebands, achieved the sound effect he desired.

In 1940, Leslie, hoping for a job with the Hammond Organ Company, demonstrated his prototype at the company's Los Angeles retail store, with Laurens Hammond listening in from Chicago by telephone. Hammond, which already offered its own speaker (the Hammond Tone Cabinet), did not appreciate the effect offered by Leslie's speaker design, and declined to manufacture or market it.

In 1941, Leslie founded Electro Music in Pasadena, California to manufacture and market the speaker, which he named the Vibratone 30A. Leslie assembled the speakers himself in his garage. He produced speakers under various names before settling on Leslie as the universally accepted name by 1949. Also in 1949, Leslie was granted a patent for his "rotatable tremulant sound producer," the first of 48 patents that Leslie would acquire over the course of his career. Other patents awarded to Leslie included radio control of model trains, and control and chlorination systems for swimming pools.

Hammond, opposed to devices designed to alter the sound of their organs, went to great lengths to disassociate their product with Leslie's, including changing speaker connectors on newer models and forbidding Hammond organ merchants to sell Leslie speakers. Even so, Leslie's speaker and the unique effect it produced became widely used with Hammond and various other brands of organs and other keyboards. Its use extended beyond theaters and churches to influence jazz, psychedelic, rock, blues, gospel, and pop music, with even guitarists and vocalists capitalizing on its effect.

In 1957, after years of actively marketing against Leslie speakers, Hammond offered to buy Electro Music, but Leslie declined the offer.

In 1965, Leslie sold Electro Music to CBS, which made it a part of CBS Musical Instruments. In 1980, seven years after the death of Laurens Hammond, the Hammond company bought Electro Music and the Leslie brand from CBS, with Donald Leslie remaining involved with the business until 1985.

Leslie was inducted into the American Music Conference Hall of Fame in 2003.

== Personal life ==
Leslie was married to his wife Carolyn for 50 years; together they had a daughter, Jeanine, and two sons, Scott and James. He was a longtime resident of Pasadena and Altadena, and a longtime member of Annandale Golf Club. In addition to music, his hobbies included tennis, model railroads, and flying private aircraft in the US, Canada, and Mexico.
