= Waterfall plot =

Data visualization technique

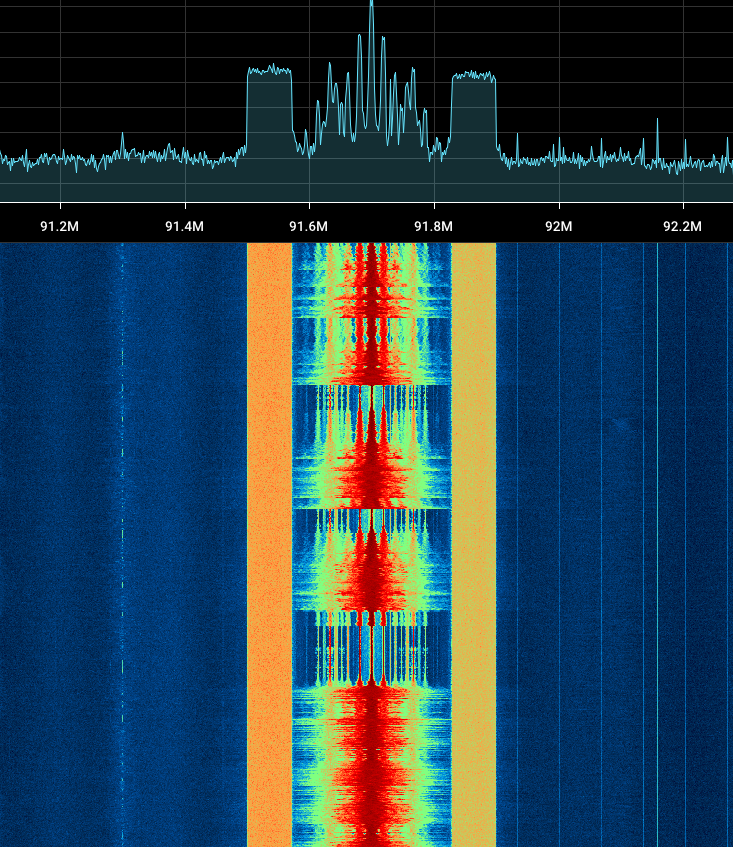
FM station broadcasting at 91.7 MHz on seen on a spectrogram

Waterfall plots are often used to show how two-dimensional phenomena change over time. A three-dimensional spectral waterfall plot is a plot in which multiple curves of data, typically spectra, are displayed simultaneously. Typically the curves are staggered both across the screen and vertically, with "nearer" curves masking the ones behind. The result is a series of "mountain" shapes that appear to be side by side. The waterfall plot is often used to show how two-dimensional information changes over time or some other variable such as rotational speed. Waterfall plots are also often used to depict spectrograms or cumulative spectral decay (CSD).

== Uses ==
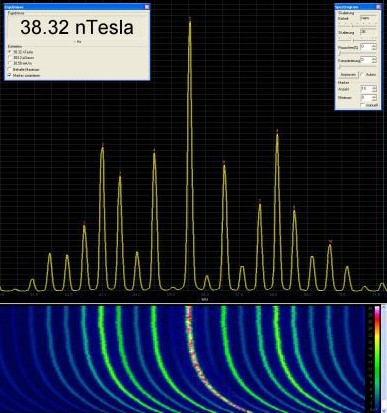
The upper half of this diagram shows the frequency spectrum of a modern switching power supply which employs spread spectrum. The lower half is a waterfall plot showing the variation of the frequency spectrum over time during the power supply's heating-up period.

- The results of spectral density estimation, showing the spectrum of the signal at successive intervals of time.
- The delayed response from a loudspeaker or listening room produced by impulse response testing or MLSSA.
- Spectra at different engine speeds when testing engines.

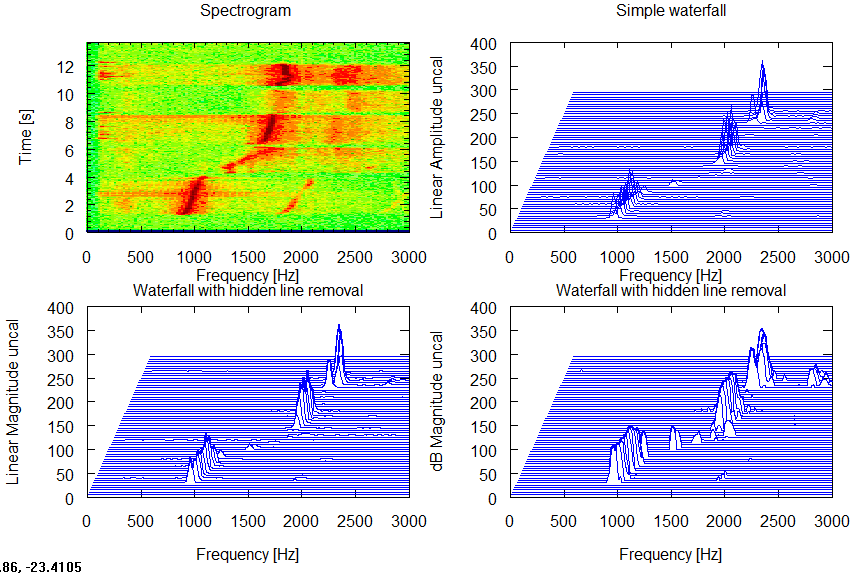
Spectrogram and 3 styles of waterfall plot of a whistled sequence of 3 notes vs time

== See also ==
- Loudspeaker acoustics
- Loudspeaker measurement
