= Loudspeaker time alignment =

Loudspeaker time-alignment, usually simply referred to as "time-alignment" or "Time-Align", is a term applied in loudspeaker systems which use multiple drivers (like woofer, mid-range and tweeter) to cover a wide audio range. It involves delaying the sound emanating from one or more drivers (greater than 2-way) to correct the transient response, improve accuracy and, in non-coaxial drivers, improve the directivity or lobe tilting at the crossover frequencies. It employs adjusting the front-to back spacing of the individual drivers so that the sound output is truly simultaneous.

== Background ==
In 1975 Ed Long in cooperation with Ronald J. Wickersham invented the first technique to Time-Align a loudspeaker systems. In 1976 Long presented "A Time-Align Technique for Loudspeakers System Design" at the 54th AES convention demonstrating the use of the Time-Align generator to design improved crossover networks for multi-way loudspeakers systems. This technique relied on subjective evaluation of various square pulses swept through the crossover frequencies. The Time-Align Generator locked the pulse on an oscilloscope so that it could be viewed. The Time-Align technique was employed by Long on the UREI 813 Studio monitor introduced in 1977. Long also manufactured near field studio monitors from the late 1970s through the 90's utilizing the Time-Align technique. In 1977 Long trademarked Time-Align and later trademarked its derivatives, Time-Aligned and Time-Alignment. (Must include the dash). Long Licensed the Time-Align trademark to UREI, Bag End Loudspeakers and others.

Since hi-fi audio requires that the loudspeaker be capable of faithful reproduction of the recorded material, it follows that a loudspeaker that better covers the audio spectrum will have better hi-fi performance. Therefore, most hi-fi loudspeakers employ multiple drivers to cover the audio spectrum satisfactorily.

At the very least, such a loudspeaker may be 2-way employing a woofer (or mid-range/mid-woofer) and a tweeter. Higher end loudspeakers may be 3-way or even 4-way. For the sake of this article and simplicity, a 2-way speaker system will be assumed - consisting of a woofer and a tweeter. Since the woofer covers the lower-end of the audio spectrum and the tweeter covers the upper-end, the dividing point between the two being the crossover frequency, it is of utmost importance that, at the crossover frequency the outputs of both drivers should acoustically sum so as to be seamless, without any peaks or dips, otherwise the loudspeaker is said to colour the sound.

A typical characteristic of a 2-way speaker is that at the crossover frequency, due to the physical distance between the centres of the woofer and tweeter, the sound that emanates from the combination is not omni-directional, but lobed. Within the region of the lobe the sound level, at the crossover frequency is much higher as compared to outside the lobe. Therefore loudspeaker designers try to make the main lobe as fat as possible, by using drivers that are as small as possible in diameter so as to allow closer spacing between them. However, the lowest frequency of interest (bass) puts a lower limit to the woofer's diameter. Therefore, such speakers will always have lobing.

== Lobe tilting ==
A typical 2-way speaker uses a woofer and a tweeter as mentioned earlier. Usually the tweeter is much smaller and thinner than a woofer. What this means is that the radiating surfaces (at the voice-coil or the dome/dust-cap depending on design, also known as the "acoustic centre") of the drivers are not in the same plane - the tweeter's radiating surface is usually much forward of the woofer when both are mounted to the same flat panel. Even though this physical offset may be of the order of 20-40mm, at typical crossover frequencies (≥ 1 kHz), this offset is enough to cause tilting of the main lobe. The image below shows this:

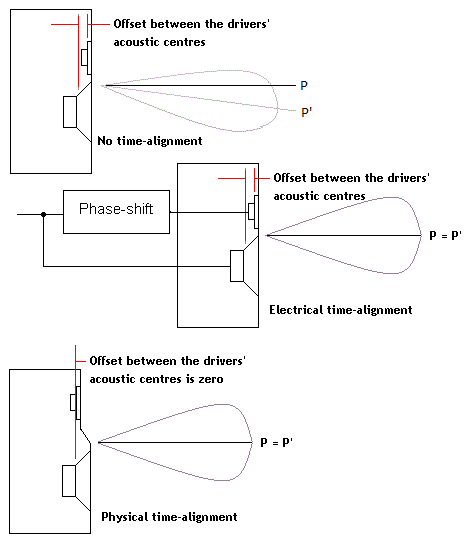

The woofer is the larger of the two, located below the tweeter. This is the most commonly used 2-way configuration. As can be seen the tweeter is much thinner and its acoustic centre is ahead of the woofer's acoustic centre. Due to this, at the crossover frequency since both drivers are producing the same frequency, the sound waves from the tweeter arrive at the listening position P earlier than those from the woofer. Due to this, at P there is non-ideal summing of the waves (they might reinforce or cancel out). Thus the main lobe points away from P towards a position P' (which for this particular speaker is lower than P).

== Correction of lobe-tilting with time-alignment ==
For most purposes the tilted lobe poses no problems and indeed many speaker systems do not use time alignment. However, there is a type of crossover called the LR4 or LR2 crossover, which has certain unique features that make time-alignment worthwhile for speakers that use it. This particular crossover has the property that at the crossover frequency the electrical summing is flat (i.e., there is no peak or dip) and the signals being sent to the woofer and tweeter are always in phase (180° out of phase in the LR2 case, which is corrected by simply inverting the tweeter's signal). When used with a loudspeaker that is time-aligned, the loudspeaker's main lobe now points exactly forward (i.e., straight) and does not have a 3dB peak in response. This makes the LR2 or LR4 crossovers ideal for audio as compared to the Butterworth type. Even without a LR crossover, it is worthwhile to have the main lobe point forward so that the speakers will illuminate the listening position evenly, resulting in better overall system performance (such as imaging or audibility).

=== Electrical time-alignment ===
In this technique (usually) the tweeter's signal is phase-shifted (usually a delay since tweeter is ahead of the woofer). This phase shift introduces an equivalent time shift in the tweeter's sound wave such that it corrects the time difference between the woofer and tweeter due to the physical offset. With a variable phase-shift filter, it becomes very easy to time align almost any speaker without having to physically alter anything. This method is also much easier and convenient over physically time-aligning the drivers. However, acoustic measurement is almost always required in this case, since the phase adjustment cannot be done by hearing alone.

=== Physical time-alignment ===
In this technique the drivers are physically offset such that their acoustic centres lie in the same physical plane. This technique is used when no other means of time alignment are available or meant to be used. It simplifies setup for the end user in that they do not need any special electronics to align the drivers. However, this technique requires that the exact depths of the acoustic centres be known at design time, so that the physical offset may be introduced in the front panel of the speaker where the drivers mount.

A common way to do this is so that the front-panel has a "step" (as shown in the above image) where the tweeter mounts at some distance behind the woofer. This step can cause more errors in summing than the time delay between the drivers due to the diffraction of the tweeter's sound waves around the step. Sloping and rounding the edges of the step helps in reducing diffraction, but it cannot be eliminated completely. Also, the more gradual the slope, greater is the vertical separation between the drivers, which in turn again causes thinning of the lobe (i.e., increase in vertical directivity) at the crossover frequency.

Another way to introduce physical time-alignment without having to physically shift the tweeter backwards is to tilt the speaker itself upwards (or have the front-panel sloping instead of vertical). This method will cause the physical on-axis plane itself to be tilted upwards - so it virtually brings the physical plane in line with the required on-axis plane. However, now the listening position is off-axis relative to either driver at all frequencies. This is the simplest of all methods (especially tilting the speaker itself upwards) in that it can be done for any speaker and lends itself more easily to setting up the speakers by trial-and-error.

== See also ==
- Acoustic lobing
- Midwoofer-tweeter-midwoofer (A technique for the correction of lobe tilting without having to time-align the drivers)
