= Keyboard amplifier =

Amplifier of an electronic keyboard

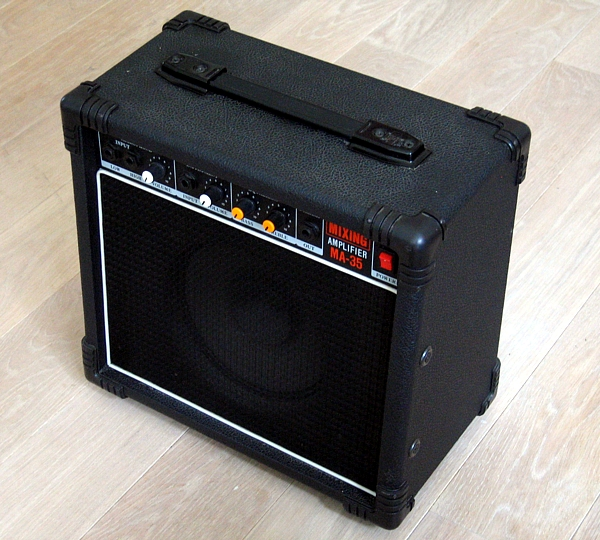
A small, inexpensive keyboard amplifier for personal home use

A keyboard amplifier is a powered electronic amplifier and loudspeaker in a speaker cabinet used for the amplification of electronic keyboard instruments. Keyboard amplifiers are distinct from other types of amplification systems such as guitar amplifiers due to the particular challenges associated with making keyboards sound louder on stage; namely, to provide solid low-frequency sound reproduction for the deep basslines that keyboards can play and crisp high-frequency sound for the high-register notes. Another difference between keyboard amplifiers and guitar/bass amplifiers is that keyboard amps are usually designed with a relatively flat frequency response and low distortion. In contrast, many guitar and bass amp designers purposely make their amplifiers modify the frequency response, typically to "roll-off" very high frequencies, and most rock and blues guitar amps, and since the 1980s and 1990s, even many bass amps are designed to add distortion or overdrive to the instrument tone (for bass, this is called "fuzz bass").

Keyboard amplifiers differ from guitar amplifiers and bass amplifiers in that whereas guitar and bass amps are usually designed for use with one guitar at a time, keyboard amplifiers almost always have a mixer with inputs for two, three, or four keyboards, because many performers often use multiple keyboards. For example, a single player may perform with a stage piano, a keytar and a synthesizer keyboard. Each channel input typically has its own pre-amplifier and volume knob. Keyboard amps in the lower cost range and power output range may only provide equalization controls (for modifying the bass and treble response) for the overall mix. Higher-priced, higher power output keyboard amps designed for professionals may have equalizer controls for each channel. Keyboard amplifiers also differ from guitar amps and bass amps in that whereas many guitar and bass amplifier companies often sell standalone amplifier units (which contain a preamplifier and power amplifier) for use with one or more separate speaker enclosures, keyboard amplifiers are almost always combination (or "combo") amplifiers, so-named because they combine a preamplifier, power amplifier, full-range speaker, and a horn-loaded tweeter, all in a single wooden speaker cabinet.

Two notable exceptions to the "low distortion" rule are keyboard amplifiers designed for the Hammond organ or clonewheel organs and amps used with electric pianos such as the Fender Rhodes. With organs used in blues or hard rock, performers often use the vintage Leslie speaker cabinet and modern recreations, which have a tube amplifier which is often turned up to add a warm, "growling" overdrive to the organ sound. With electric pianos used in a rock or funk band, natural tube overdrive is often added to the sound.

== Design ==
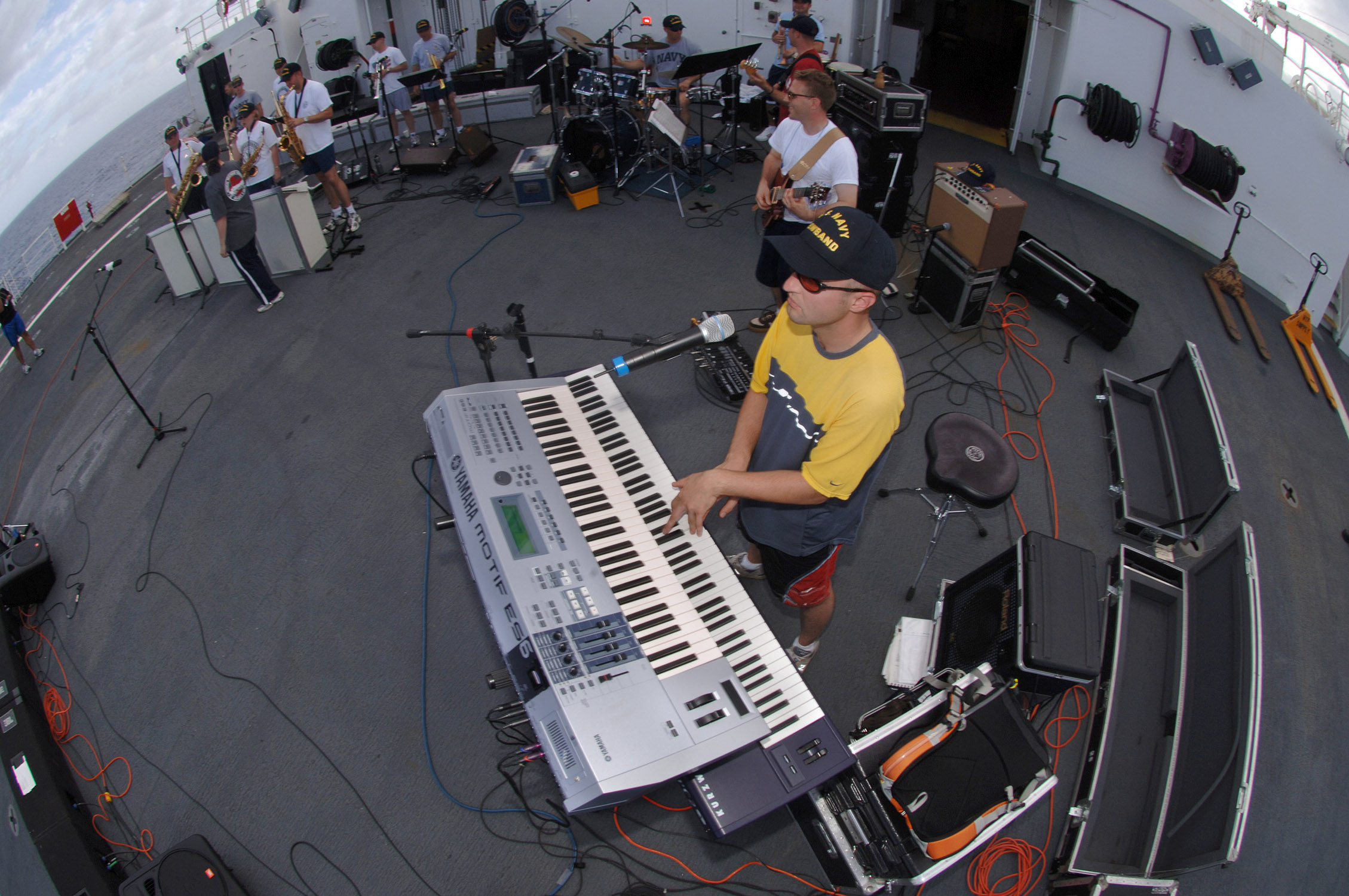
A US Navy keyboardist playing his Yamaha and Kurzweil keyboards through a large Roland keyboard amp.

Since keyboards have a very wide range of pitches, from deep bass notes to very high treble notes, keyboard amplifiers have to provide solid low-frequency sound reproduction and crisp high-frequency sound reproduction. This distinction affects the design of the loudspeakers, the speaker cabinet and the preamplifier and amplifier. They usually include tuned bass reflex ports or vents for increased efficiency at low frequencies. Since keyboard amplifiers have to be able to reproduce very high notes, they are often equipped with a tweeter, which may be mounted in a horn.

=== Comparison with guitar and bass amplifiers ===
While electric guitar amplifiers are typically designed to modify the tone of the guitar (e.g., by adding distortion and rolling off high frequencies), keyboard amplifiers intended for general use for a range of keyboard applications usually have very low distortion and extended, flat frequency response in both directions. Electric guitar amp combos and amps are usually designed to add coloration to the guitar tone or "sweeten" the tone. Keyboard amp combos are usually designed to reproduce the input signals. The exception to this rule is keyboard amplifiers designed for the Hammond organ, such as the vintage Leslie speaker cabinet and modern recreations, which have a tube amplifier which is often turned up to add a warm, "growling" overdrive to the organ sound. Electric piano players in rock and funk also often seek to add natural tube overdrive to their sound.

Unlike bass amplifiers and electric guitar amplifiers, keyboard amplifiers are rarely used in the "amplifier head" and separate speaker cabinet configuration. Instead, most keyboard amplifiers are "combo" amplifiers that integrate the amplifier, tone controls, and speaker into a single wooden cabinet. Another unusual aspect of keyboard amplifiers is that they are often designed with a "wedge" shape, as used with monitor speakers. This permits them to be used as monitor speakers (with the amplifier in front of the seated keyboardist, aiming up at them) which is more suitable for a seated keyboardist.

=== Design features ===
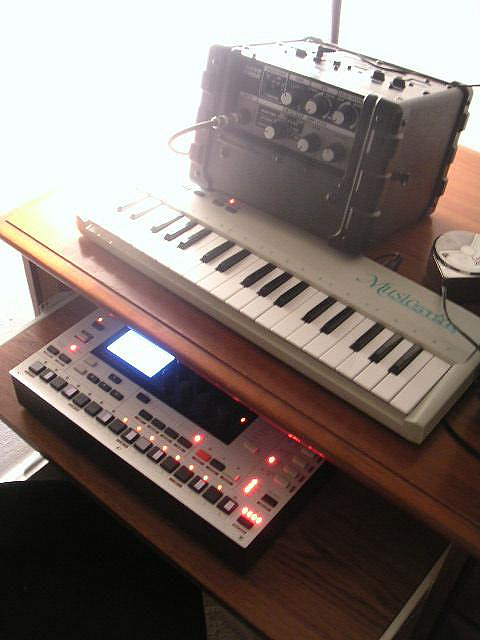
A tiny BOSS micro-cube keyboard amp is being used with a MIDI keyboard.

Keyboard amplifiers often have an onboard three or four-channel mixer, so that multiple keyboards (e.g., a stage piano, synthesizer, and clonewheel organ) can be plugged into one amplifier and so that keyboardists can control the tone and level of several keyboards. In some genres, such as progressive rock, for example, keyboardists may perform with several synthesizers, electric pianos, and electro-mechanical keyboards. Keyboard amplifiers often have onboard reverb effects.

Most inexpensive to mid-priced amplifiers currently produced are based on semiconductor (solid-state) circuits. Solid-state amplifiers vary in output power, functionality, size, price, and sound quality in a wide range, from practice amplifiers to professional models. The smallest, most inexpensive practice amplifiers may have only two channels with volume controls and one or two tone controls. Home practice amps have from 20 to 30 watts of power, often through an 8" or 10" speaker. Small keyboard amplifiers designed for small band rehearsals have 50 to 75 watts, a 12-inch speaker, and possibly a tweeter. Large keyboard amplifiers designed for shows in large clubs or halls have 200 to 300 watts of power, a 12-inch or 15-inch speaker (or two 12-inch speakers), and a horn-loaded tweeter.

Some keyboard amps may be equipped with a compressor or limiter to protect the speaker from damage when the amplifier is being used at high volume levels. Some keyboard amps (e.g., Yorkville's 200-watt keyboard amp and Peavey's KB-4) have an extension speaker jack, which enables the amp to be connected to a second speaker cabinet for more volume.

=== Use in performances ===
In small venues such as a coffeehouse or small bar, a keyboardist might not connect the keyboard amp up to the PA system, and just use the sound of the keyboard amp to provide the keyboard sound for the venue. At most mid-sized venues and all large venues, such as stadiums, the signal from the keyboard amp's pre-amp out jack, DI out jack and/or the microphoned sound from the speaker and horn are fed to the mixing board and then amplified with the PA system or sound reinforcement system. In cases where a keyboardist has a rotating Leslie speaker, microphones are always used to pick up the sound, rather than taking an electronic signal from the amp, because only a mic can capture the unique sound of Leslie's rotating horns and speaker drum.

=== Comparison with PA systems ===
In the 2010s, there was some convergence between the functionality of keyboard combo amplifiers and small PA systems. Some keyboard amplifiers have an XLR input for a microphone and a microphone preamplifier. To use a microphone, a preamp is generally needed to boost the power of the signal because mic's only output a tiny, weak signal. This input's inclusion of a preamp means that it could also be used to plug in an acoustic guitar's piezoelectric pickup. This type of keyboard amplifier could be used as a PA system by a singer-songwriter who is accompanying herself or himself on guitar and keyboards in a very small venue, such as a coffeehouse.

Keyboard amps with an XLR mic input, preamplifier and a multichannel mixer are in effect small combo PA systems. While small combo keyboard amps with mic inputs became widely available on the market in the 2000s (decade) and were promoted as an innovation, in fact, the first portable PA systems sold in the 1920s and 1930s were "combo" systems, in which a power amplifier and speaker were combined in a single wooden cabinet. Instrument amplifiers from the 1950s and 1960s still sometimes included inputs for microphones, as few portable PA systems were available for garage bands during this era. By the 1970s and 1980s, though, portable PA systems were typically sold as three-piece sets: an amp-mixer containing a small mixer (with four to six channels) and a power amplifier integrated into a single amp head-style chassis with a handle, and two separate PA speakers. The speakers were typically connected to the amp-mixer with speaker cables. Providing separate speakers, enabled bands to elevate the speakers and place them at either side of the stage, which improved sound dispersion over the former approach of using instrument amplifiers to boost both instrument and vocal sounds.

There are several limitations to using a combo keyboard amp as a small PA system. First, it is hard to elevate a keyboard amp's speaker the way most PA speakers can be raised up, using PA system speaker stands with a pole onto which most small- to mid-sized PA speaker enclosures can be mounted using their base-mounted metal socket (a hole in a metal plate). Elevating a PA speaker above the audience helps to ensure that the sound is dispersed to the whole audience; if a combo keyboard amp is used as a small PA, the keyboard amp is typically placed on the floor or raised a bit by placing it on a table. In this scenario, the sound produced by the keyboard amp would be absorbed by the first several rows of audience members, and people in the back of the venue might not be able to hear the performance. Second, most small, low-wattage keyboard amps do not produce enough volume to clearly project the lead vocals into the venue so that they are at the "front of the mix", a sound preferred in many pop genres. For example, whereas a small PA system for a coffeehouse would typically have 100 watts, a small keyboard combo amp may only be rated at 20 watts. Third, while the vast majority of small PA systems come with two speaker cabinets, most combo keyboard amps have a single speaker cabinet. With two speaker cabinets, even if both are pointing straight out at the audience, this provides better coverage of the room; moreover, the two speaker cabinets can be angled outwards a bit, increasing the arc of coverage better for wide rooms.

=== Stereo models ===
While most keyboard amplifiers produce monophonic sound, a small number of higher-priced, higher-wattage keyboard combo amps have two speakers and two horns and can produce stereophonic sound. When a stereo keyboard amp is used with a stereo chorus effect or Leslie speaker simulator pedal, this can produce a spacious, full sound. Some keyboard amp combos have a stereo link output, which can be connected to a second keyboard amp combo to provide stereo sound onstage.

== Use of subwoofer ==
Keyboardists who want powerful low-end may use a powered subwoofer cabinet designed for use in a PA system. Some keyboard combo amps have a "sub out" jack so that the amp can be plugged into an external powered subwoofer cabinet for extra bass. Subwoofers can only produce deep bass frequencies up to about 150 or 200 Hz, so a subwoofer cabinet must be paired with a full-range speaker to obtain the full tonal range of an electric piano or organ. Keyboard players who use subwoofers for on-stage monitoring include electric organ players who use bass pedal keyboards (which go down to a low "C" which is about 33 Hz) and synth bass players who play rumbling sub-bass parts that go as low as 18 Hz. Of all of the keyboard instruments that are amplified onstage, synthesizers can produce some of the lowest pitches, because unlike a traditional electric piano or electric organ, which have as their lowest notes a low "A" and a low "C", respectively, a synth does not have a fixed lowest octave. A synth player can add lower octaves to a patch by pressing an "octave down" button, which can produce pitches that are at the limits of human hearing.

Several concert sound subwoofer manufacturers suggest that their subs can be used for instrument amplification. Meyer Sound suggests that its 650-R2 Concert Series Subwoofer, a 14-cubic-foot (0.40 m^{3}) enclosure with two 18-inch (460 mm) drivers, can be used for bass instrument amplification. While performers who use concert sound subwoofers for onstage monitoring may like the powerful sub-bass sound that they get onstage, sound engineers may find the use of large subwoofers (e.g., two 18-inch (460 mm) drivers) for onstage instrument monitoring to be problematic, because it may interfere with the "Front of House" sub-bass sound.

== Rotating speakers ==
Medley
A medley played on a 1935 Model A Hammond organ through a Leslie speaker.

Chord Sequence
A simple chord sequence played on a Hammond organ through a Leslie speaker.

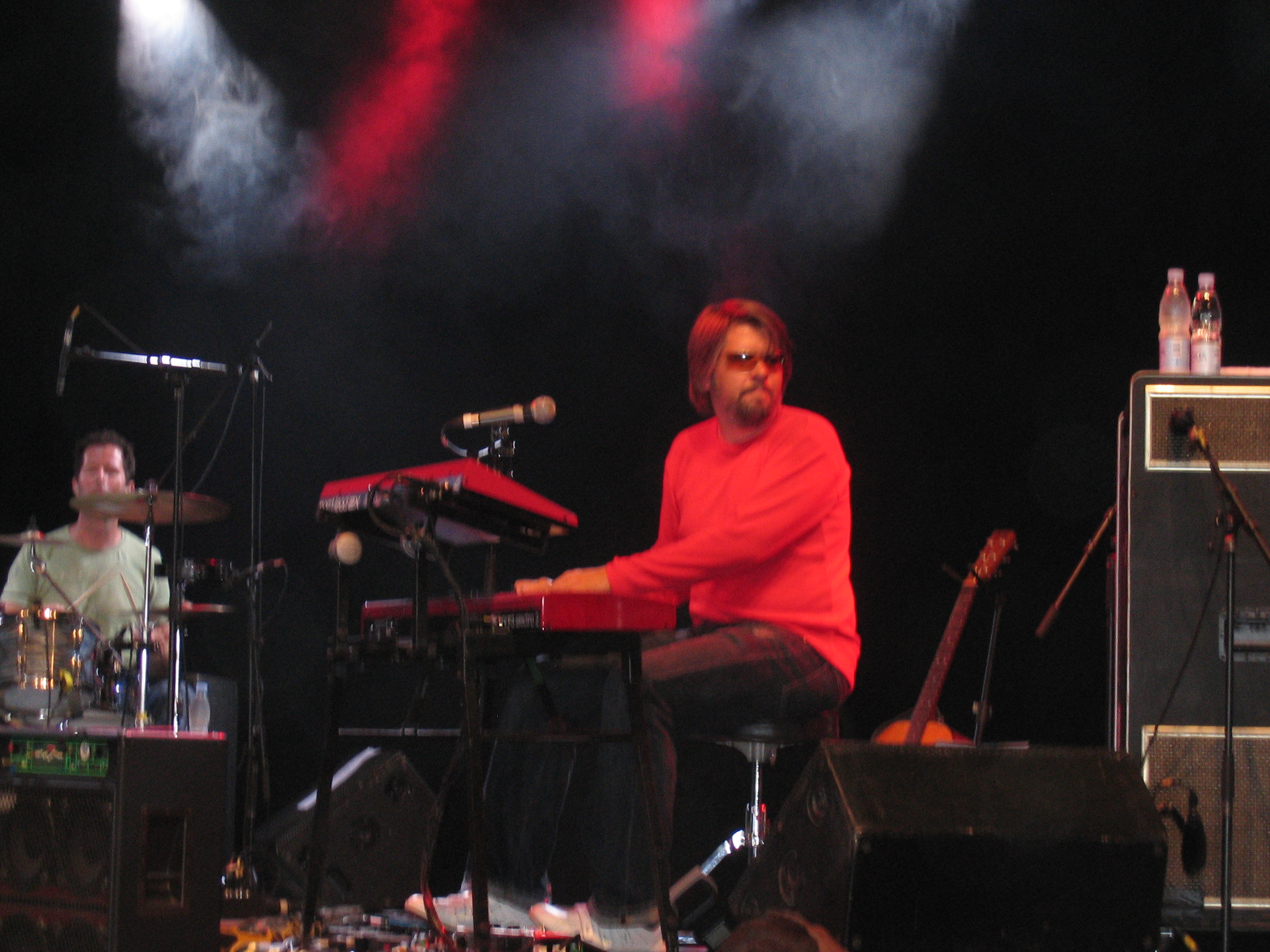
A keyboardist playing a live show with a big Leslie cabinet (visible to his right).

The Leslie speaker is a specially constructed amplifier/loudspeaker cabinet used to create special audio effects such as vibrato, chorus and tremolo. The Leslie creates these effects by rotating the tweeters or horns or a spinning a sound-directing duct around the bass woofer speaker, which causes the Doppler effect. Named after its inventor, Donald Leslie, it is particularly associated with the Hammond organ, but is used with a variety of instruments (notably electric guitar) and sometimes with vocals. The Hammond/Leslie combination has become a key element of the sound in many genres of music, including early heavy metal music (e.g., Deep Purple), blues, jazz organ trios and some rock genres. The Leslie Speaker and the Hammond Organ brands are currently owned by Suzuki Musical Instrument Corporation. Due to the large size and heavy weight of the Leslie Speaker cabinet, some keyboardists use a small effects unit, such as the Uni-vibe, instead, and plug the unit into a regular keyboard amp. The most expensive rotating speaker effect units use digital modelling and digital signal-processing to produce a realistic-sounding recreation of the real Leslie speaker system.

== Other approaches ==
Not all keyboard players use keyboard amplifiers to make their instruments audible on stage. Some keyboard players use a combo guitar amplifier, with a power amplifier and a speaker in a single wooden cabinet. The potential challenge with using guitar amps with keyboards is that a guitar amp is only designed to go down to about 82 Hz, the lowest note on an electric guitar, while an electric piano or Hammond organ may go down as low as 30 Hz. Playing these low keyboard pitches through a guitar amp may damage the speaker. Some keyboardists use bass amplifier combos for their stage sound. While bass amps can easily handle the low pitches of a keyboard instrument, bass combo amps from the 1970s and 1980s are less likely than post-1990s bass combo amps to have a speaker and a high-register horn. Horn-less vintage combo bass amps may not provide crisp, accurate reproduction of high-pitched keyboard sounds.

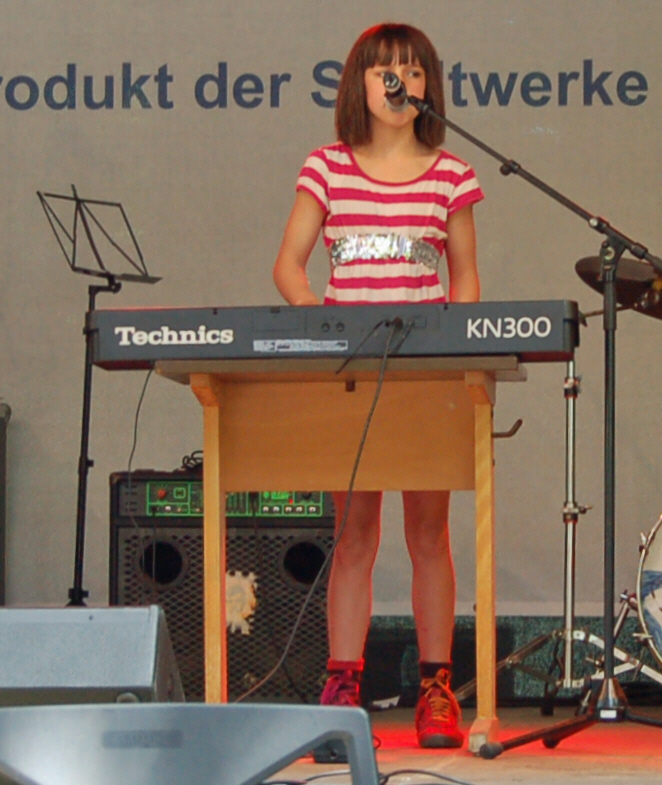
A keyboardist using a Trace Elliot bass amplifier combo for her onstage sound.

Another approach used by some keyboard players is to use a small PA system for their keyboards. This approach can work well, because small PA systems typically have four to eight inputs, which can accommodate a large keyboard setup with multiple keyboards (electric piano, Hammond organ, synth, etc.). The other benefit of using a PA system is that they use full-range speakers which contain a woofer and a tweeter, which are designed to reproduce the full range of sounds, from rumbling bass notes to piercing high notes.

Some keyboard players use powered PA speakers (also called "active speakers") with their keyboards. Powered PA speakers are speaker enclosures with a built-in power amplifier and, in some cases, other electronic components. In the 2010s, there is a convergence between the functionality of powered speakers and small PA systems, because some powered PA speakers include a small mixer, an XLR input for a microphone, and a microphone pre-amp. While these powered PA speakers have full-range capability (as they contain woofers and tweeters) and they are robust enough for high-volume live music, some models are not designed to be portable, and so they lack carrying handles and metal-protected corners. These types of powered monitor speakers are more suitable for a fixed keyboard setup in a home studio, recording studio or music school.

== Selected brands ==
Below the keyboard amplifier lineups of three mainstream brands are described. These lineups are described to give readers a sense of the range in size, speaker types and power (in watts) of standard keyboard combo amplifiers. These brands were chosen because they are widely available.

=== Peavey ===
Peavey's smallest keyboard amp is the KB 1. It has 20 watts, an 8" speaker, and "2 separate channels with a 2-band EQ per channel and a headphone out." This amp would be suitable for in-home practice. The next keyboard amp in the Peavey line is the KB 2. It has one ten-inch speaker "four separate channels, including a mic input on channel 3 and a monitor input on channel 4", a "2-band EQ per channel, headphone out, FX send/return, and balanced XLR out", and it is rated at 40 watts. This amp would be a good model for at-home practice. It could be used for a rehearsal for a quieter genre of music, such as folk. The KB 3 has 60 watts, a "12" speaker with tweeter...[,] 3 separate channels each have 2-band EQ and Channel 1 has mic input." There is also a balanced XLR main out, an effects send/return and a "headphone out with level control". Peavey's KB 4 puts out 75 watts through a 15-inch speaker. The onboard mixer has a "2-band EQ and main effects send/return", the "Mic/Line channel has 3-band EQ and effects send/return plus monitor input with level control and assign, and a headphone out with level control." This amp would be suitable for rehearsal or small venue shows (e.g., a coffeehouse).

=== Roland ===
Roland's smallest keyboard amp is the CM-30 Cube Monitor. It delivers 30 watts through a 6.5-inch speaker and it has "3 input channels, with one XLR mic/line input and 2 additional AUX RCA and stereo mini-phone inputs, making a total of 5 simultaneous inputs possible." i Roland's KC-60 delivers 40 watts through a 10" speaker and piezo tweeter. It has "3 separate channels that include 1/4" line, XLR mic, and aux inputs...[,] channel and headphone outputs plus low and hi EQ." Roland's KC-150 is delivers 65 watts through a 12" speaker and piezo tweeter. It has "4-channel capability, 2-band EQ, XLR mic input, and RCA stereo auxiliary input." Roland's KC-350 delivers 120 watts through a 12" speaker and horn tweeter. It has "4-channel operation, 3-band EQ, XLR mic input, output select switch, and shape switch for quick tonal adjustment." This amp could be used for rehearsals and mid-sized shows. Their KC-550 delivers 180 watts through a 15" speaker and horn tweeter. It has the same channel and EQ features as the KC-350. This is a good amp for larger show venues. The flagship of the KC line-up is the KC-990 Stereo Keyboard Amp. It has 320 watts of power split over two 12-inch woofers and two tweeters, a variety of inputs and effects, and handles and casters to make it more easily portable.

=== Yorkville ===
The 50 KW has 50 watts of power, a 10" woofer and a 3.75" tweeter. It has "2-channel operation", with "Channel 1 optimized for microphones with an XLR and a 1/4" input" and "Channel 2 optimized for line level and keyboard sources with 2 phone jack inputs and 2 RCA inputs" The 50 KW is wedge-shaped, so it can be used as a monitor for a seated keyboardist. The 200 KB delivers 200 watts through a 15" woofer and a horn tweeter. It is a four-channel amp. Channels 1 and two have an XLR and TRS phone jack. "Channel 3 has a TRS phone jack input", and "Channel 4 has one TRS phone jack and 2 RCA jacks" There are treble and bass tone controls for channels 1 and 2. This amp would be suitable for mid-to large-sized shows.

== See also ==
- Guitar amplifier
- Instrument amplifier
- Power amplifier
