= Jabez Gough enclosure =

The Jabez Gough Enclosure (also known as the Jabez Gough Loudspeaker, or Gough Loudspeaker) was invented in 1960 by Jabez Gough, a radio engineer, living in Cardiff, South Wales. Gough devised and constructed a wooden housing for a loudspeaker unit which importantly also acted as an acoustic chamber, rather in the way that the body of a violin serves as a sound box for the strings. Challenging the dominant acoustic theories of his day and opposed by some major loudspeaker manufacturers, Gough decided to publish and sell his own plans for the construction of the enclosure, which proved very popular in this do-it-yourself era and many thousands of copies were purchased by hi-fi enthusiasts worldwide.

The Jabez Gough Enclosure was first demonstrated publicly on 19 October 1960, in Tongwynlais, South Wales. The event quickly attracted national publicity. In a front-page article for The Observer on 27 November, Peter Schirmer declared that a Gough enclosure, fitted with a single 12-inch loudspeaker unit, "could fill St Pauls Cathedral with almost perfect high fidelity sound." Gough subsequently took a pair of his enclosures to demonstrate in London's famous Covent Garden Opera House. Powered by a single 15-watt valve (tube) amplifier, and fitted with two eight-inch loudspeaker units, the Jabez Gough Enclosures managed to fill the opera house with sound.

Jabez Gough patented his invention in August 1961, but no large-scale manufacture of the units ever took place, largely because Gough himself was not interested in commercial development of the idea. Nevertheless, word of the invention spread far and wide around the world; and by November 1961, the Popular Science magazine in America published a feature article on the phenomenon. Meanwhile, in the UK, Gough's invention was the focus for a popular BBC television programme in the 'How to Make it' series, in July 1961.

By 1973 some 35,000 copies of the construction plans for the enclosure had been sold around the world. One specialist commentator wrote at this time that the Gough Enclosure, and its revolutionary design, was "one of the biggest controversies the hi-fi world has known."

Measuring almost six feet square, the Jabez Gough Enclosure inevitably lost popularity as portability and miniaturisation of audio systems took hold in the eighties and nineties. Now in the modern digital era, the Gough loudspeaker is all but extinct. However, Gough's legacy is still not quite forgotten as fifty years later his work is still the subject of public controversy, as is witnessed in a recent feature in Hi-Fi News.
