= Loudspeaker acoustics =

Subfield of acoustical engineering

Loudspeaker acoustics is a subfield of acoustical engineering concerned with the design of loudspeakers. It focuses on the reproduction of sound and the parameters involved in doing so in actual equipment.

Engineers measure the performance of drivers and complete speaker systems to characterize their behavior, often in an anechoic chamber, outdoors, or using time windowed measurement systems -- all to avoid including room effects (e.g., reverberation) in the measurements.

Designers use models (from electrical filter theory) to predict the performance of drive units in different enclosures, now almost always based on the work of A N Thiele and Richard Small.

Important driver characteristics are:

- Frequency response
- Off-axis response dispersion pattern, lobing
- Sensitivity (dB SPL for 1 watt input)
- Maximum power handling
- Non-linear distortion
- Colouration (i.e., more or less, delayed resonance).

It is the performance of a loudspeaker/listening room combination that really matters, as the two interact in multiple ways. There are two approaches to high-quality reproduction. One ensures the listening room is reasonably 'alive' with reverberant sound at all frequencies, in which case the speakers should ideally have equal dispersion at all frequencies in order to equally excite the reverberant fields created by reflections off room surfaces. The other attempts to arrange the listening room to be 'dead' acoustically, leaving indirect sound to the dispersion of the speakers need only be sufficient to cover the listening positions.

A dead or inert acoustic may be best, especially if properly filled with 'surround' reproduction, so that the reverberant field of the original space is reproduced realistically. This is currently quite hard to achieve, and so the ideal loudspeaker systems for stereo reproduction would have a uniform dispersion at all frequencies. Listening to sound in an anechoic "dead" room is quite different from listening in a conventional room, and, while revealing about loudspeaker behaviour it has an unnatural sonic character that some listeners find uncomfortable. Conventional stereo reproduction is more natural if the listening environment has some acoustically reflective surfaces.

It is in large part the directional properties of speaker systems, which vary with frequency, that make them sound different, even when they measure similarly well on-axis. Acoustical engineering in this instance is concerned with adapting these variations to each other.

== Notable experts ==
In the 1930s, one of the leading experts on loudspeaker acoustics was N. W. McLachlan, author of Loud Speakers: Theory, Performance, Testing and Design.

== See also ==
- Audio quality measurement
- Acoustic lobing
- Loudspeaker time alignment
- Digital room correction
- Directional Sound
- Impulse response
- Loudspeaker
- Loudspeaker measurement
- MLSSA
- Sound quality
- Spectrogram
