= Speaker grille =

Protective speaker cover

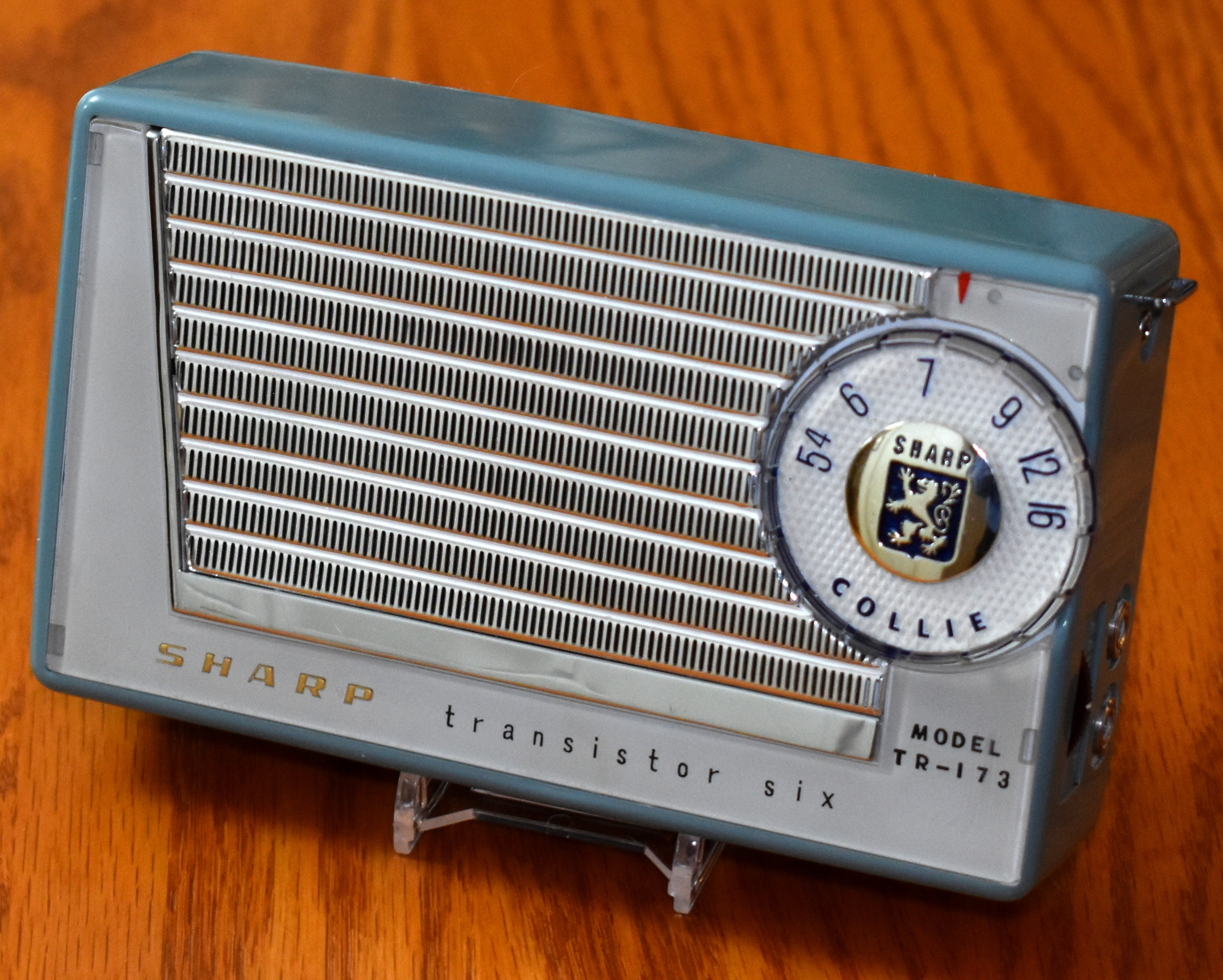
Hard chrome-plated speaker grille on a transistor radio

A speaker grille (or speaker grill) is a hard or soft screen found on the front of many consumer and industrial loudspeakers, mounted directly over the face of the speaker driver. Its main purpose is to protect the driver element and speaker internals (and possibly other audio components) from foreign objects while still allowing the sound to pass clearly. Small fabric membranes are commonly used in mobile phones and earbud headphones to protect loudspeakers and microphones. Similar to grilles on larger audio systems, these membranes safeguard against moisture, contaminants, pressure fluctuations, and physical intrusion.

The grille or membrane interacts with the sound produced, as it lies in the path between the loudspeaker and the listener. To ensure minimal impact on sound quality, the reduction in sound—referred to as transmission loss—must be quantified. While more robust grilles offer greater protection, they also result in higher transmission loss, requiring a balance between protection and sound quality to be achieved based on the specific application.

== Types ==
=== Soft ===
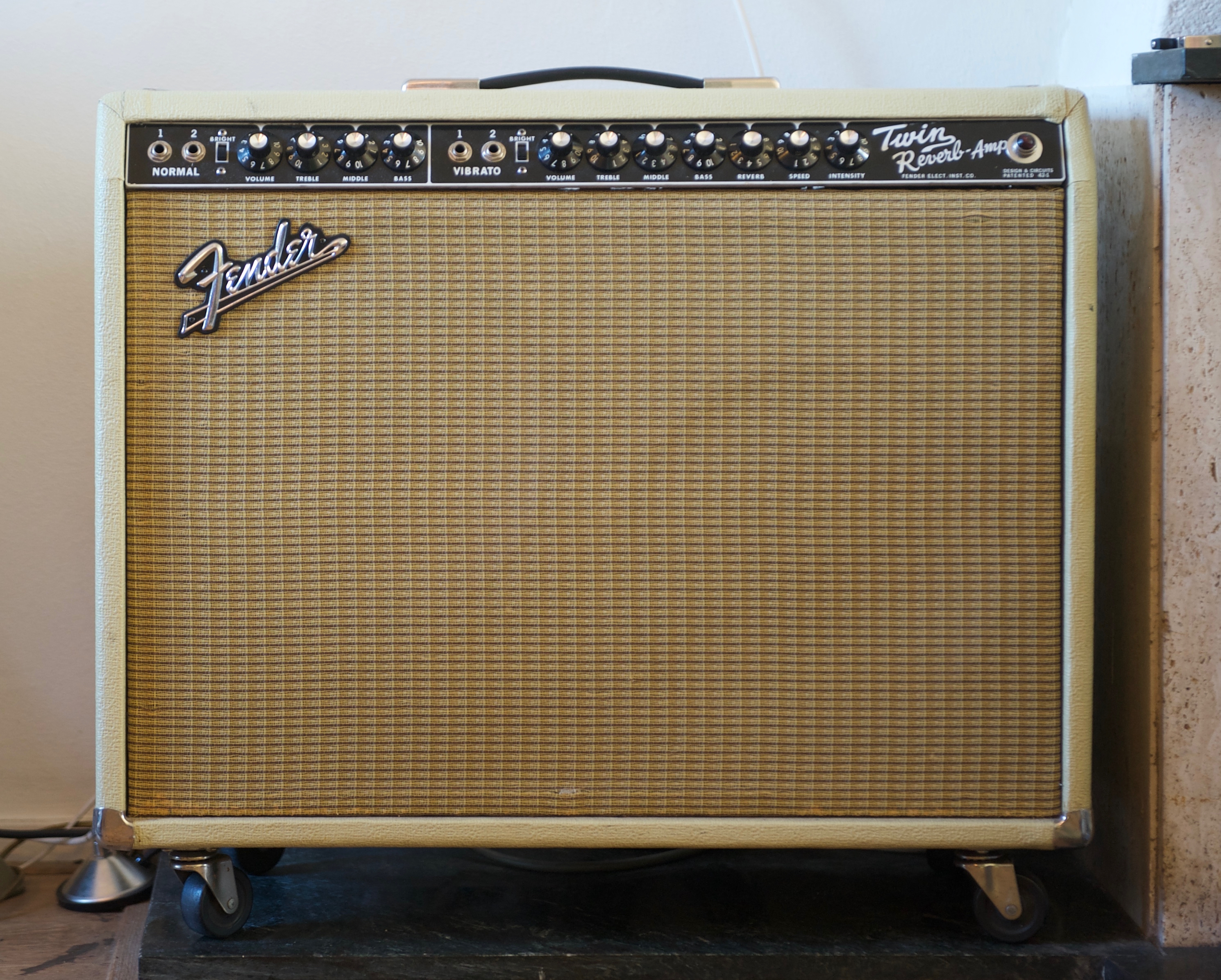
Cloth speaker grille on a Fender Twin amplifier

Soft grilles can be made from any well-suited cloth, weaving, stitching, foam, fabric upholsteries, and other similar materials. In general, soft grilles impose little resistance on the speaker driver because the material is free to move synchronously with the sound waves. Because the grille is capable of absorbing this vibration, softer grilles are (in general) less prone to rattling except at extremely high sound pressure levels.

Soft grilles offer protection from small, lightweight objects, and may be water resistant to some degree but could be susceptible to being torn, or even stretched enough to reach the driver.

=== Hard ===
Hard grilles can be made from many types of construction material including metal, wood, or plastic. Some solid grilles are made from a board or sheet of material with holes drilled or cut for the sound to pass, while others are made with thin strips of material either crosshatched together or equally spaced in parallel.

Because hard material is not free to move with the speaker's sound like soft material, the speaker's output level must be considered when designing the grille. A grille with more holes will allow more sound to pass but will offer less protection from small objects. A speaker with too much material in front of the driver will begin to distort at higher sound pressure levels, and in severe instances could damage the speaker, resulting in unwanted rattling at the least.

== Practicalities ==
Some types of speakers have such unique characteristics that a grille would interact too much with the sound to be practical. Studio monitors, for instance, are required to reproduce audio so accurately that anything in the path of the speaker could obscure aspects of the sound, and thus are rarely seen with grilles.

On the other hand, high-powered subwoofers (such as those used in high-end car audio applications), produce such violent sound waves that a grille may be susceptible to rattling or damage while the driver is under load. All but the most sparse grilles also possess the possibility of diminishing or distorting the low-frequency waves being produced.

Grilles on domestic loudspeakers have been shown to affect their performance; however, they are commonly included to provide protection required for the home environment.

Some speakers simply don't need a grille, perhaps because they are enclosed in a case (such as speakers found inside personal computers) and are not meant to produce high-fidelity audio, but only audible tones and noises.

== See also ==
- Grating
- Grille (architecture)
- Loudspeaker
- Loudspeaker enclosure
