= Test CD =

Compact disc containing audio test signals

A test CD is a compact disc containing tracks of musical and technical tests and demonstrations. Most of the tracks are made of electronic signals and pure frequencies. The purpose of these specialized compact discs is to make accurate tests and calibrate audio equipment.

== Releases ==
A wide variety of CD-DA test discs have been produced in the past, and a few are still in production:

- Stereophile Test CD 2
- CD-CHECK Test Disc
- NAB Broadcast & Audio Test CD, Vol 1 (still in production)
- NAB Broadcast & Audio Test CD, Vol 2 (still in production)
- Precision Test Signals
- The Ultimate Test CD
- CBS Records CD-1 Standard Test Disc (with EIA standard signals)
- EIAJ CD-1 Standard Test Disc (YGDS 13) (EIAJ Standard CP-308)
- Denon Audio Technical CD 38C39-7147
- Japan Audio Society Audio Test CD-1 (YDDS-2)
- Philips Test Sample 4a
- Sony Test CD Type 3 YEDS-7
- Technics CD Test Disc SH-CD001

== See also ==
- Audio equipment testing
- Super Audio CD
