= Loudspeaker enclosure =

Acoustical component

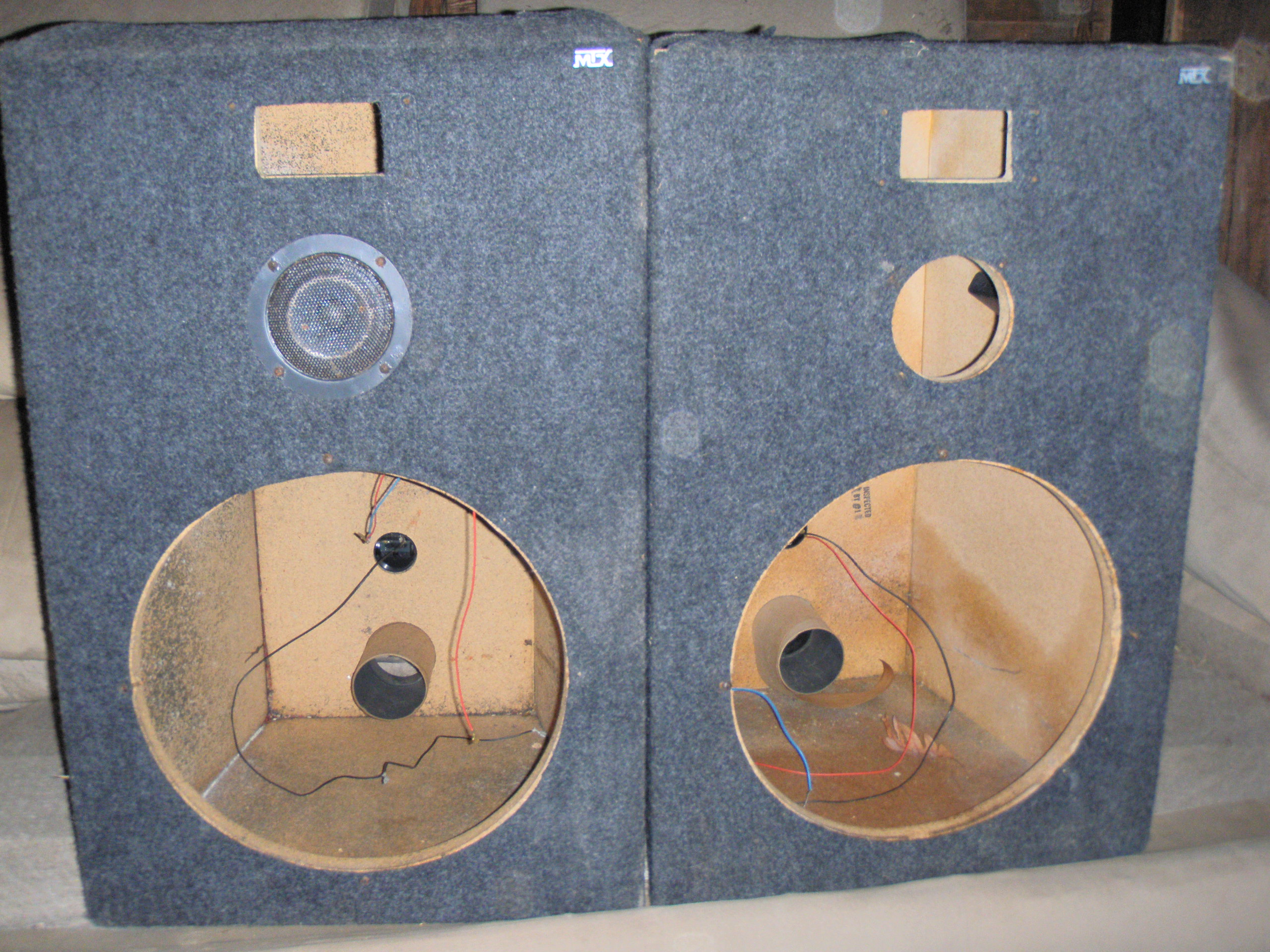
MTX Audio loudspeaker enclosures (with rear panel reflex port tubes) which can mount 15-inch woofers, mid-range drivers and horn and/or compression tweeters. In this photo, only one driver is mounted.

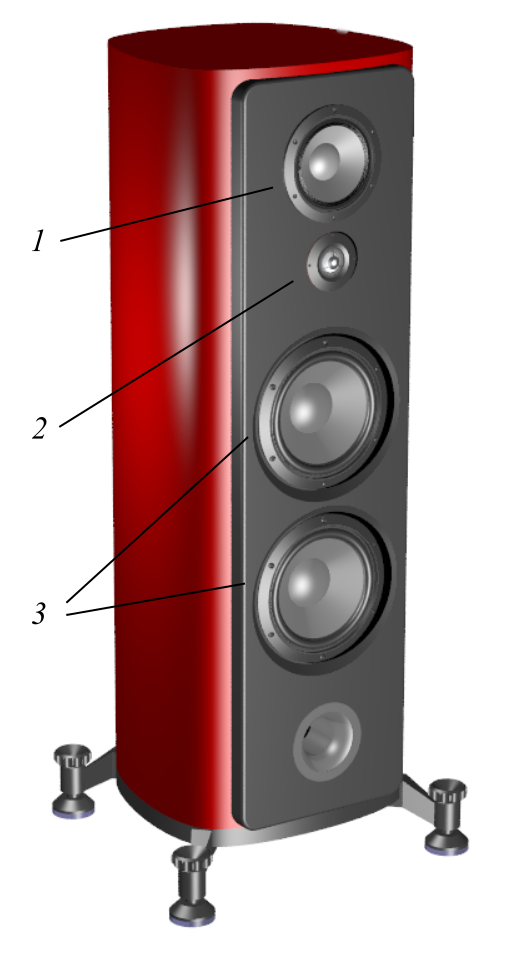
A cabinet with loudspeakers mounted. 1 – a mid-range driver. 2 – a high-frequency tweeter. 3 – two low-frequency woofers. Below the bottom woofer is a bass reflex port.

A loudspeaker enclosure or loudspeaker cabinet is an enclosure (often rectangular box-shaped) in which speaker drivers (e.g., woofers and tweeters) and associated electronic hardware, such as crossover circuits and, in some cases, power amplifiers, are mounted. Enclosures may range in design from simple, homemade DIY rectangular particleboard boxes to very complex, expensive computer-designed hi-fi cabinets that incorporate composite materials, internal baffles, horns, bass reflex ports and acoustic insulation. Loudspeaker enclosures range in size from small "bookshelf" speaker cabinets with 4-inch (10 cm) woofers and small tweeters designed for listening to music with a hi-fi system in a private home to huge, heavy subwoofer enclosures with multiple 18-inch (46 cm) or even 21-inch (53 cm) speakers in huge enclosures which are designed for use in stadium concert sound reinforcement systems for rock music concerts.

The primary role of an enclosure is to prevent sound waves generated by the rearward-facing surface of the diaphragm of an open speaker driver from interacting with sound waves generated at the front of the speaker driver. Because the forward- and rearward-generated sounds are out of phase with each other, any interaction between the two in the listening space creates a distortion of the original signal as it was intended to be reproduced. As such, a loudspeaker cannot be used without installing it in a baffle of some type, such as a closed box, vented box, open baffle, or a wall or ceiling (infinite baffle).

An enclosure also plays a role in managing vibration induced by the driver frame and moving air mass within the enclosure, as well as heat generated by driver voice coils and amplifiers (especially where woofers and subwoofers are concerned). Sometimes considered part of the enclosure, the base may include specially designed feet to decouple the speaker from the floor. Enclosures designed for use in PA systems, sound reinforcement systems and for use by electric musical instrument players (e.g., bass amp cabinets) have a number of features to make them easier to transport, such as carrying handles on the top or sides, metal or plastic corner protectors, and metal grilles to protect the speakers. Speaker enclosures designed for use in a home or recording studio typically do not have handles or corner protectors, although they do still usually have a cloth or mesh cover to protect the woofer and tweeter. These speaker grilles are a metallic or cloth mesh that are used to protect the speaker by forming a protective cover over the speaker's cone while allowing sound to pass through undistorted.

Speaker enclosures are used in homes in stereo systems, home cinema systems, televisions, boom boxes and many other audio appliances. Small speaker enclosures are used in car stereo systems. Speaker cabinets are key components of a number of commercial applications, including sound reinforcement systems, movie theatre sound systems and recording studios. Electric musical instruments invented in the 20th century, such as the electric guitar, electric bass and synthesizer, among others, are amplified using instrument amplifiers and speaker cabinets (e.g., guitar amplifier speaker cabinets).

== History ==
Early on, radio loudspeakers consisted of horns, often sold separately from the radio itself (typically a small wooden box containing the radio's electronic circuits, so they were not usually housed in an enclosure. When paper cone loudspeaker drivers were introduced in the mid 1920s, radio cabinets began to be made larger to enclose both the electronics and the loudspeaker. These cabinets were made largely for the sake of appearance, with the loudspeaker simply mounted behind a round hole in the cabinet. It was observed that the enclosure had a strong effect on the bass response of the speaker. Since the rear of the loudspeaker radiates sound out of phase from the front, there can be constructive and destructive interference for loudspeakers without enclosures, and below frequencies related to the baffle dimensions in open-baffled loudspeakers. This results in a loss of bass and in comb filtering, i.e., peaks and dips in the response power regardless of the signal that is meant to be reproduced. The resulting response is akin to two loudspeakers playing the same signal but at different distances from the listener, which is like adding a delayed version of the signal to itself, whereby both constructive and destructive interference occur.

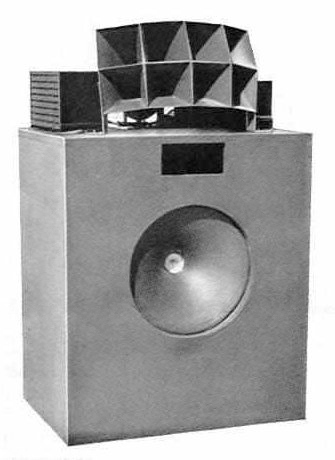
A Lansing Iconic multicell horn loudspeaker from 1937

Before the 1950s, many manufacturers did not fully enclose their loudspeaker cabinets; the back of the cabinet was typically left open. This was done for several reasons, not least because electronics (at that time, tube equipment) could be placed inside and cooled by convection in the open enclosure.

Most of the enclosure types discussed in this article were invented either to wall off the out-of-phase sound from one side of the driver or to modify it so that it could be used to enhance the sound produced from the other side.

== Background ==
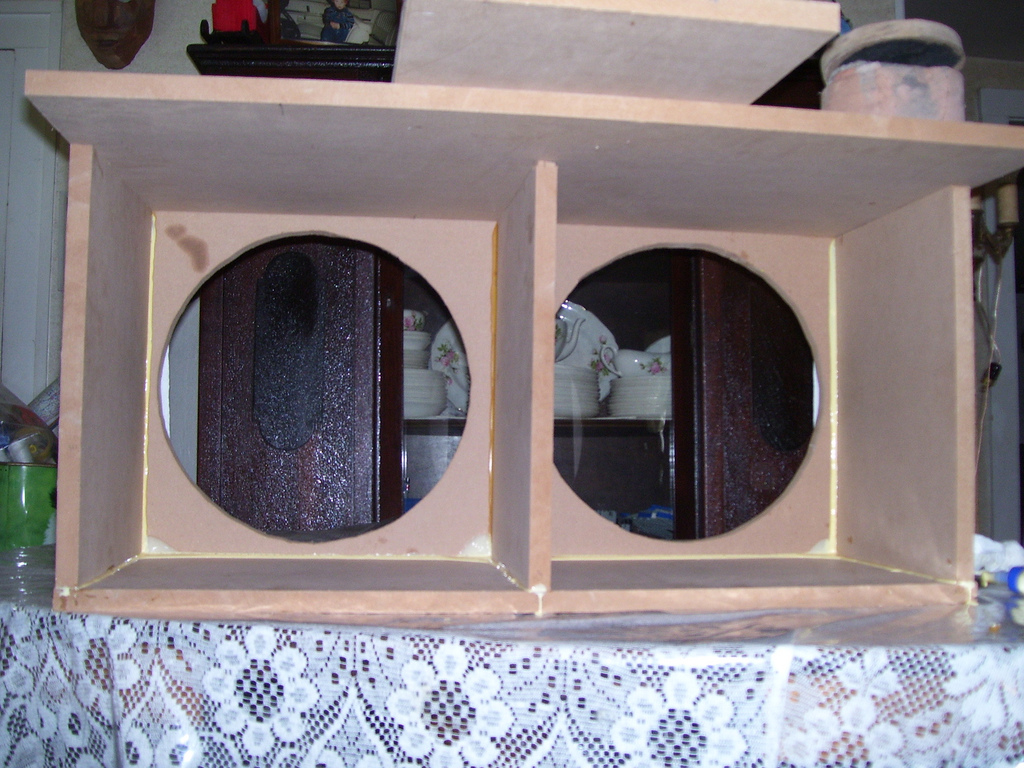
Medium-density fiberboard is a common material out of which loudspeaker enclosures are built.

In some respects, the ideal mounting for a low-frequency loudspeaker driver would be a rigid flat panel of infinite size with infinite space behind it. This would entirely prevent the rear sound waves from interfering (i.e., comb filter cancellations) with the sound waves from the front. An open baffle loudspeaker is an approximation of this, since the driver is mounted on a panel, with dimensions comparable to the longest wavelength to be reproduced. In either case, the driver would need a relatively stiff suspension to provide the restoring force, which might have been provided at low frequencies by a smaller sealed or ported enclosure, so few drivers are suitable for this kind of mounting.

The forward- and rearward-generated sounds of a speaker driver appear out of phase with each other because they are generated through the opposite motion of the diaphragm and because they travel different paths before converging at the listener's position. A speaker driver mounted on a finite baffle will display a physical phenomenon known as interference, which can result in perceivable frequency-dependent sound attenuation. This phenomenon is particularly noticeable at low frequencies, where the wavelengths are large enough that interference will affect the entire listening area.

Since infinite baffles are impractical and finite baffles tend to suffer poor response as wavelengths approach the dimensions of the baffle (i.e., at lower frequencies), most loudspeaker cabinets use some sort of structure (usually a box) to contain the out-of-phase sound energy. The box is typically made of wood, wood composite, or, more recently, plastic, for reasons of ease of construction and appearance. Stone, concrete, plaster, and even building structures have also been used.

Enclosures can have a significant effect beyond what was intended, with panel resonances, diffraction from cabinet edges and standing wave energy from internal reflection/reinforcement modes being among the possible problems. Bothersome resonances can be reduced by increasing enclosure mass or rigidity, by increasing the damping of enclosure walls or wall/surface treatment combinations, by adding stiff cross bracing, or by adding internal absorption. Wharfedale, in some designs, reduced panel resonance by using two wooden cabinets (one inside the other) with the space between filled with sand. Home experimenters have even designed speakers built from concrete, granite and other exotic materials for similar reasons.

Many diffraction problems, above the lower frequencies, can be alleviated by the shape of the enclosure, such as by avoiding sharp corners on the front of the enclosure. A comprehensive study of the effect of cabinet configuration on the sound distribution pattern and overall response-frequency characteristics of loudspeakers was undertaken by Harry F. Olson. It involved a very wide number of different enclosure shapes, and it showed that curved loudspeaker baffles reduce some response deviations due to sound wave diffraction. It was discovered later that careful placement of a speaker on a sharp-edged baffle can reduce diffraction-caused response problems.

Sometimes the differences in phase response at frequencies shared by different drivers can be addressed by adjusting the vertical location of the smaller drivers (usually backwards), or by leaning or stepping the front baffle, so that the wavefront from all drivers is coherent at and around the crossover frequencies in the speaker's normal sound field. The acoustic center of the driver dictates the amount of rearward offset needed to time-align the drivers.

== Types ==
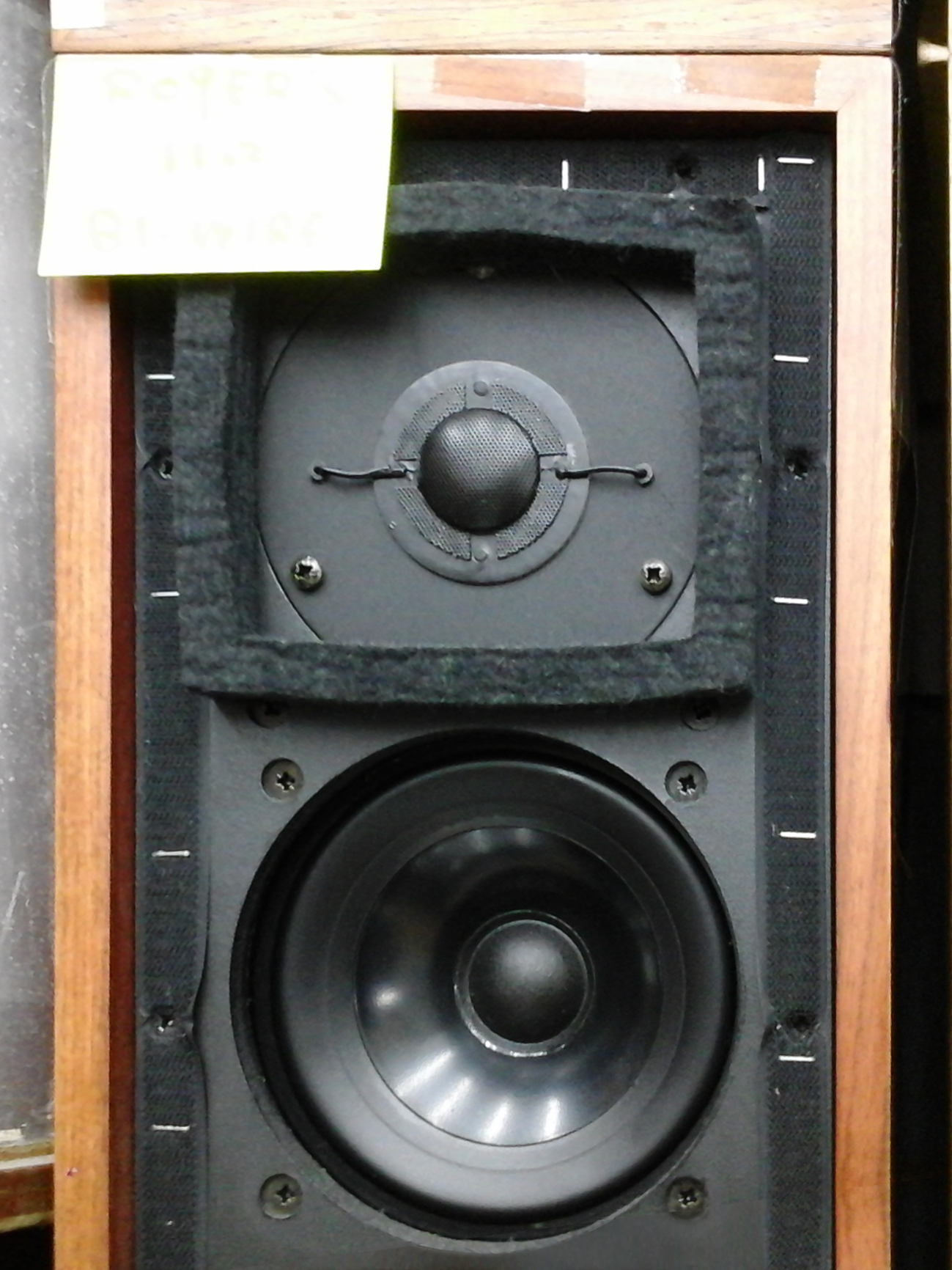
A small bookshelf speaker, an LS3/5A, with its protective grille cover removed

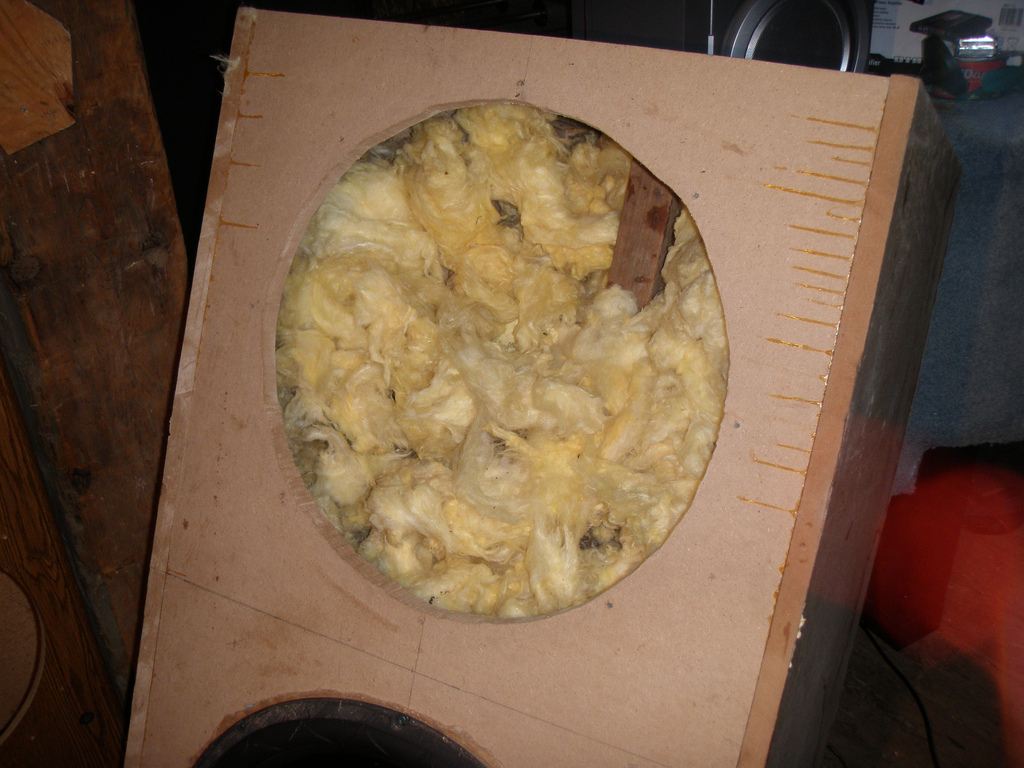
A box stuffed with fiberglass insulation to increase the effective volume of the box

Enclosures used for woofers and subwoofers can be adequately modeled in the low-frequency region using acoustics and the lumped component models. Electrical filter theory has been used with considerable success for some enclosure types. For the purposes of this type of analysis, each enclosure must be classified according to a specific topology. The designer must balance low bass extension, linear frequency response, efficiency, distortion, loudness and enclosure size, while simultaneously addressing issues higher in the audible frequency range such as diffraction from enclosure edges, the baffle step effect when wavelengths approach enclosure dimensions, crossovers, and driver blending.

=== Closed-box (sealed) enclosures ===
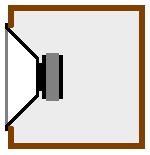
A closed-box loudspeaker enclosure

The loudspeaker driver's moving mass and compliance (slackness or reciprocal stiffness of the suspension) determine the driver's resonance frequency (F_{s}). In combination with the damping properties of the system (both mechanical and electrical), all these factors affect the low-frequency response of sealed-box systems. The response of closed-box loudspeaker systems has been extensively studied by Small and Benson, amongst many others. Output falls below the system's resonance frequency (F_{c}), defined as the frequency of peak impedance. In a closed-box loudspeaker, the air inside the box acts as a spring, returning the cone to the zero position in the absence of a signal. A significant increase in the effective volume of a closed-box loudspeaker can be achieved by a filling of fibrous material, typically fiberglass, bonded acetate fiber (BAF) or long-fiber wool. The effective volume increase can be as much as 40% and is due primarily to a reduction in the speed of sound propagation through the filler material as compared to air. The enclosure or driver must have a small leak so that the internal and external pressures can equalise over time, to compensate for changes in barometric pressure or altitude; the porous nature of paper cones, or an imperfectly sealed enclosure, is normally sufficient to provide this slow pressure equalisation.

==== Infinite baffle ====
A variation on the open baffle approach is to mount the loudspeaker driver in a very large sealed enclosure, providing minimal air spring restoring force to the cone. This minimizes the change in the driver's resonance frequency caused by the enclosure. The low-frequency response of infinite baffle loudspeaker systems has been extensively analysed by Benson. Some infinite baffle enclosures have used an adjoining room, basement, or a closet or attic. This is often the case with exotic rotary woofer installations, as they are intended to go to frequencies lower than 20 Hz and displace large volumes of air. Infinite baffle (IB) is also used as a generic term for sealed enclosures of any size, the name being used because of the ability of a sealed enclosure to prevent any interaction between the forward and rear radiation of a driver at low frequencies.

In conceptual terms an infinite baffle is a flat baffle that extends out to infinity – the so-called endless plate. A genuine infinite baffle cannot be constructed but a very large baffle such as the wall of a room can be considered to be a practical equivalent. A genuine infinite-baffle loudspeaker has an infinite volume (a half-space) on each side of the baffle and has no baffle step. However, the term infinite-baffle loudspeaker can fairly be applied to any loudspeaker that behaves (or closely approximates) in all respects as if the drive unit is mounted in a genuine infinite baffle. The term is often and erroneously used of sealed enclosures which cannot exhibit infinite-baffle behavior unless their internal volume is much greater than the Vas Thiele/Small of the drive unit AND the front baffle dimensions are ideally several wavelengths of the lowest output frequency. It is important to distinguish between genuine infinite-baffle topology and so-called infinite-baffle or IB enclosures which may not meet genuine infinite-baffle criteria. The distinction becomes important when interpreting textbook usage of the term (see Beranek (1954, p. 118) and Watkinson (2004)).

==== Acoustic suspension ====
Acoustic suspension or air suspension is a variation of the closed-box enclosure, using a box size that exploits the almost linear air spring, resulting in a −3 dB low-frequency cut-off point of 30–40 Hz from a box of only one to two cubic feet or so. The spring suspension that restores the cone to a neutral position is a combination of an exceptionally compliant (soft) woofer suspension and the air inside the enclosure. At frequencies below system resonance, the air pressure caused by the cone motion is the dominant force. Developed by Edgar Villchur in 1954, this technique was used in the very successful Acoustic Research line of bookshelf speakers in the 1960s–70s. The acoustic suspension principle takes advantage of this relatively linear spring. The enhanced suspension linearity of this type of system is an advantage. For a specific driver, an optimal acoustic suspension cabinet will be smaller than a bass reflex, but the bass reflex cabinet will have a lower −3 dB point. The voltage sensitivity above the tuning frequency remains a function of the driver, and not of the cabinet design.

==== Isobaric loading ====
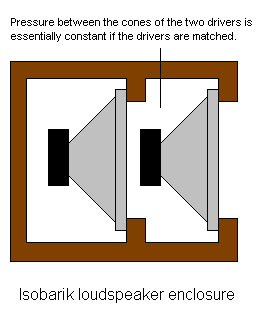
Isobaric loudspeaker in a cone-to-magnet (in-phase) arrangement. The image above shows a sealed enclosure; vented enclosures may also use the isobaric scheme.

The isobaric loudspeaker configuration was first introduced by Harry F. Olson in the early 1950s, and refers to systems in which two or more identical woofers (bass drivers) operate simultaneously, with a common body of enclosed air adjoining one side of each diaphragm. In practical applications, they are most often used to improve low-end frequency response without increasing cabinet size, though at the expense of cost and weight. Two identical loudspeakers are coupled to work together as one unit: they are mounted one behind the other in a casing to define a chamber of air in between. The volume of this isobaric chamber is usually chosen to be fairly small for reasons of convenience. The two drivers operating in tandem exhibit exactly the same behavior as one loudspeaker in twice the cabinet.

=== Ported (or reflex) enclosures ===
==== Bass-reflex ====
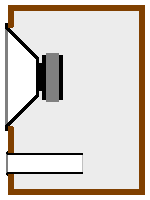
Bass reflex enclosure

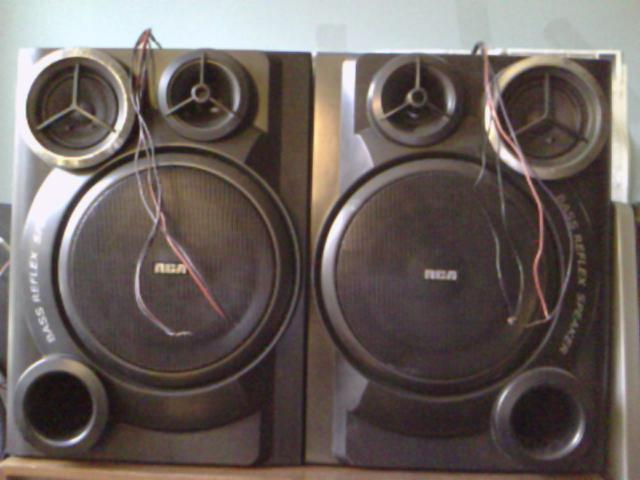
RCA shelf stereo bass reflex multi-way speakers

Also known as vented (or ported) systems, these enclosures have a vent or hole cut into the cabinet and a port tube affixed to the hole to improve low-frequency output, increase efficiency, or reduce the size of an enclosure. Bass reflex designs are used in home stereo speakers (including both low- to mid-priced speaker cabinets and expensive hi-fi cabinets), bass amplifier speaker cabinets, keyboard amplifier cabinets, subwoofer cabinets and PA system speaker cabinets. Vented or ported cabinets use cabinet openings or transform and transmit low-frequency energy from the rear of the speaker to the listener. They deliberately and successfully exploit Helmholtz resonance. As with sealed enclosures, they may be empty, lined, filled or (rarely) stuffed with damping materials. Port tuning frequency is a function of the cross-sectional area of the port and its length. This enclosure type is very common, and provides more sound pressure level near the tuning frequency than a sealed enclosure of the same volume, although it actually has less low-frequency output at frequencies well below the cut-off frequency, since the rolloff is steeper (24 dB/octave versus 12 dB/octave for a sealed enclosure). Malcolm Hill pioneered the use of these designs in a live event context in the early 1970s.

Vented system design using computer modeling has been practiced since about 1985. It made extensive use of the theory developed by researchers such as Thiele, Benson, Small and Keele, who had systematically applied electrical filter theory to the acoustic behavior of loudspeakers in enclosures. In particular, Thiele and Small became very well known for their work. While ported loudspeakers had been produced for many years before computer modeling, achieving optimum performance was challenging, as it is a complex sum of the properties of the specific driver, the enclosure and port, because of an imperfect understanding of the assorted interactions. These enclosures are sensitive to small variations in driver characteristics and require special quality control attention for uniform performance across a production run. Bass ports are widely used in subwoofers for PA systems and sound reinforcement systems, in bass amp speaker cabinets and in keyboard amp speaker cabinets.

==== Passive radiator ====
Passive radiator enclosure

A passive radiator speaker uses a second passive driver, or drone, to produce similar low-frequency extension, or efficiency increase, or enclosure size reduction, similar to ported enclosures. Small and Hurlburt have published the results of research into the analysis and design of passive-radiator loudspeaker systems. The passive-radiator principle was identified as being particularly useful in compact systems where vent realization is difficult or impossible, but it can also be applied satisfactorily to larger systems. The passive driver is not wired to an amplifier; instead, it moves in response to changing enclosure pressures. In theory, such designs are variations of the bass reflex type, but with the advantage of avoiding a relatively small port or tube through which air moves, sometimes noisily. Tuning adjustments for a passive radiator are usually accomplished more quickly than with a bass reflex design since such corrections can be as simple as mass adjustments to the drone. The disadvantages are that a passive radiator requires precision construction like a driver, thus increasing costs, and may have excursion limitations.

==== Compound or band-pass ====
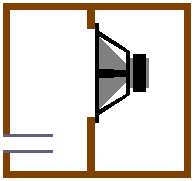
Compound, or fourth-order, band-pass enclosure

A fourth-order electrical bandpass filter can be simulated by a vented box in which the contribution from the rear face of the driver cone is trapped in a sealed box, and the radiation from the front surface of the cone is directed into a ported chamber. This modifies the resonance of the driver. In its simplest form, a compound enclosure has two chambers. The dividing wall between the chambers holds the driver; typically, only one chamber is ported.

If the enclosure on each side of the woofer has a port in it, then the enclosure yields a 6th-order band-pass response. These are considerably harder to design and tend to be very sensitive to driver characteristics. As in other reflex enclosures, the ports may generally be replaced by passive radiators if desired. An eighth-order bandpass box is another variation that also has a narrow frequency range. They are often used to achieve sound pressure levels, in which case a bass tone of a specific frequency would be used, rather than anything musical. They are complicated to build and must be done quite precisely in order to perform as intended.

==== Aperiodic enclosures ====
This design falls between acoustic suspension and bass reflex enclosures. It can be thought of as either a leaky sealed box or a ported box with large amounts of port damping. By setting up a port, and then blocking it precisely with sufficiently tightly packed fiber filling, it is possible to adjust the damping in the port as desired. The result is control of the resonance behavior of the system, which improves low-frequency reproduction, according to some designers. Dynaco was a primary producer of these enclosures for many years, using designs developed by a Scandinavian driver maker. The design remains uncommon among commercial designs currently available. A reason for this may be that adding damping material is a needlessly inefficient method of increasing damping; the same alignment can be achieved by simply choosing a loudspeaker driver with the appropriate parameters and precisely tuning the enclosure and port for the desired response.

A similar technique has been used in aftermarket car audio; it is called aperiodic membrane (AP). A resistive mat is placed in front of or directly behind the loudspeaker driver (usually mounted on the rear deck of the car in order to use the trunk as an enclosure). The loudspeaker driver is sealed to the mat so that all acoustic output in one direction must pass through the mat. This increases mechanical damping, and the resulting decrease in the impedance magnitude at resonance is generally the desired effect, though there is no perceived or objective benefit to this. Again, this technique reduces efficiency, and the same result can be achieved through selection of a driver with a lower Q factor, or even via electronic equalization. This is reinforced by the purveyors of AP membranes; they are often sold with an electronic processor, which, via equalization, restores the bass output lost through the mechanical damping. The effect of the equalization is opposite to that of the AP membrane, resulting in a loss of damping and an effective response similar to that of the loudspeaker without the aperiodic membrane and electronic processor.

=== Dipole enclosures ===
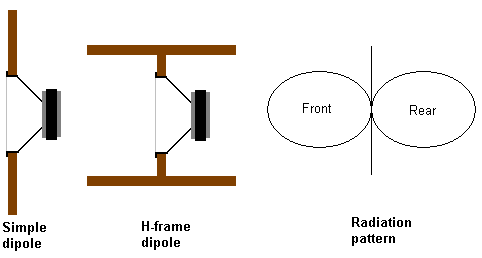
Dipole speakers and their radiation pattern

A dipole enclosure in its simplest form is a driver located on a flat baffle panel, similar to older open-back cabinet designs. The baffle's edges are sometimes folded back to reduce its apparent size, creating a sort of open-backed box. A rectangular cross-section is more common than curved ones since it is easier to fabricate in a folded form than a circular one. The baffle dimensions are typically chosen to obtain a particular low-frequency response, with larger dimensions giving a lower frequency before the front and rear waves interfere with each other. A dipole enclosure has a figure-of-eight radiation pattern, which means that there is a reduction in sound pressure, or loudness, at the sides as compared to the front and rear. This is useful if it can be used to prevent the sound from being as loud in some places as in others.

=== Horn enclosures ===
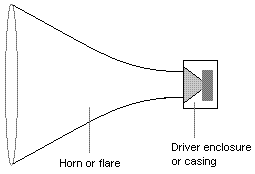
Horn loudspeaker schematic

A horn loudspeaker is a speaker system using a horn to match the driver cone to the air. The horn structure itself does not amplify, but rather improves the coupling between the speaker driver and the air. Properly designed horns have the effect of making the speaker cone transfer more of the electrical energy in the voice coil into the air; in effect, the driver appears to have higher efficiency. Horns can help control dispersion at higher frequencies, which is useful in some applications such as sound reinforcement. The mathematical theory of horn coupling is well developed and understood, though implementation is sometimes difficult. Properly designed horns for high frequencies are small (above 2,000 Hz on average, a few centimetres or inches); those for mid-range frequencies (perhaps 200 to 2,000 Hz) much larger, perhaps 30 to 60 cm (1 or 2 feet), and for low frequencies (under 200 Hz) very large, a few metres (dozens of feet). In the 1950s, a few high-fidelity enthusiasts actually built full-sized horns whose structures were built into a house wall or basement. With the coming of stereo (two speakers) and surround sound (four or more), plain horns became even more impractical. Various speaker manufacturers have produced folded low-frequency horns that are much smaller (e.g., Altec Lansing, JBL, Klipsch, Lowther, Tannoy) and actually fit in practical rooms. These are necessarily compromises, and because they are physically complex, they are expensive.

==== Multiple-entry horn ====
Multiple-entry horn

The multiple-entry horn (also known under the trademarks CoEntrant, Unity and Synergy horn) is a manifold speaker design; it uses several different drivers mounted on the horn at stepped distances from the horn's apex, where the high-frequency driver is placed. Depending on implementation, this design offers an improvement in transient response as each of the drivers is aligned in phase and time and exits the same horn mouth. A more uniform radiation pattern throughout the frequency range is also possible. A uniform pattern is handy for smoothly arraying multiple enclosures.

==== Tapped horn ====
Both sides of a long-excursion high-power driver in a tapped horn enclosure are ported into the horn itself, with one path length long and the other short. These two paths combine in phase at the horn's mouth within the frequency range of interest. This design is especially effective at subwoofer frequencies and offers reductions in enclosure size along with more output.

=== Transmission line ===
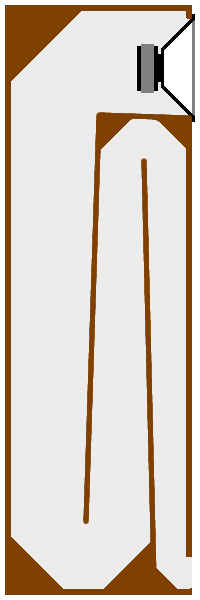
Transmission line enclosure

A perfect transmission line loudspeaker enclosure has an infinitely long line, stuffed with absorbent material such that all the rear radiation of the driver is fully absorbed, down to the lowest frequencies. Theoretically, the vent at the far end could be closed or open with no difference in performance. The density of and material used for the stuffing is critical, as too much stuffing will cause reflections due to back-pressure, whilst insufficient stuffing will allow sound to pass through to the vent. Stuffing often is of different materials and densities, changing as it gets further from the back of the driver's diaphragm.

Consequent to the above, practical transmission line loudspeakers are not true transmission lines, as there is generally output from the vent at the lowest frequencies. They can be thought of as a waveguide in which the structure shifts the phase of the driver's rear output by at least 90°, thereby reinforcing the frequencies near the driver's free-air resonance frequency f_{s}. Transmission lines tend to be larger than ported enclosures of approximately comparable performance, due to the size and length of the guide that is required (typically 1/4 the longest wavelength of interest).

The design is often described as non-resonant, and some designs are sufficiently stuffed with absorbent material that there is indeed not much output from the line's port. But it is the inherent resonance (typically at 1/4 wavelength) that can enhance the bass response in this type of enclosure, albeit with less absorbent stuffing. Among the first examples of this enclosure design approach were the projects published in Wireless World by Bailey in the early 1970s, and the commercial designs of the now defunct IMF Electronics which received critical acclaim at about the same time.

A variation on the transmission line enclosure uses a tapered tube, with the terminus (opening/port) having a smaller area than the throat. The tapering tube can be coiled for lower-frequency driver enclosures to reduce the dimensions of the speaker system, resulting in a seashell-like appearance. Bose uses similar patented technology on their Wave and Acoustic Waveguide music systems.

Numerical simulations by Augspurger and King have helped refine the theory and practical design of these systems.

=== Quarter-wave enclosure ===
A quarter-wave resonator is a transmission line tuned to form a standing quarter wave at a frequency somewhat below the driver's resonance frequency F_{s}. When properly designed, a port that is of much smaller diameter than the main pipe located at the end of the pipe then produces the driver's backward radiation in phase with the speaker driver itself, greatly adding to the bass output. Such designs tend to be less dominant in certain bass frequencies than the more common bass reflex designs, and followers of such designs claim an advantage in clarity of the bass with a better congruency of the fundamental frequencies to the overtones. Some loudspeaker designers like Martin J. King and Bjørn Johannessen consider the term quarter wave enclosure as a more fitting term for most transmission lines, and since acoustically, quarter wavelengths produce standing waves inside the enclosure that are used to produce the bass response emanating from the port. These designs can be considered a mass-loaded transmission line design or a bass reflex design, as well as a quarter-wave enclosure. Quarter-wave resonators have seen a revival as commercial applications with the onset of neodymium drivers that enable this design to produce relatively low bass extensions within a relatively small speaker enclosure.

=== Tapered quarter-wave pipe ===
The tapered quarter-wave pipe (TQWP) is an example of a combination of transmission line and horn effects. It is highly regarded by some speaker designers. The concept is that the sound emitted from the rear of the loudspeaker driver is progressively reflected and absorbed along the length of the tapering tube, almost completely preventing internally reflected sound from being retransmitted through the cone of the loudspeaker. The lower part of the pipe acts as a horn, while the top can be visualised as an extended compression chamber. The entire pipe can also be seen as a tapered transmission line in inverted form. (A traditional tapered transmission line, confusingly also sometimes referred to as a TQWP, has a smaller mouth area than throat area.) Its relatively low adoption in commercial speakers can mostly be attributed to the large resulting dimensions of the speaker produced and the expense of manufacturing a rigid tapering tube. The TQWP is also known as a Voigt pipe, and was introduced in 1934 by Paul G. A. H. Voigt, Lowther's original driver designer.

== See also ==
- Acoustic transmission line
- Audio crossover
- Full-range speaker
- Guitar speaker cabinet
- Impedance matching
- Jabez Gough enclosure
- Midrange speaker
- Powered speakers
- Subwoofer
- Soundbar
- Speaker grille
- Super tweeter
- Transmission line loudspeaker
- Tweeter
- Woofer
