= Acoustic lobing =

Acoustic lobing refers to the radiation pattern of a combination of two or more loudspeaker drivers at a certain frequency, as seen looking at the speaker from its side. In most multi-way speakers, it is at the crossover frequency that the effects of lobing are of greatest concern, since this determines how well the speaker preserves the tonality of the original recorded content.

In practice, room-effects and interactions largely mean that the ideal loudspeaker (or combination thereof) is not practically possible. However a speaker that has the best dispersion at all frequencies of interest (especially the crossover frequency), will have the least colouration of sound - i.e., it will most faithfully reproduce the recorded material. Thus, an ideal speaker would have no lobes at all frequencies - in other words it will act as a point source radiating omnidirectionally at all frequencies. In practice all speakers will exhibit some amount of lobing at the crossover frequency. The primary reasons for this are the physical distance between the drivers, and the drivers' effective diameters relative to the frequency of interest.

Lobing is measured as having a comb filtering response (i.e., areas of peaks and dips) as the listening position varies vertically^{‡} w.r.t. the nominal on-axis position. Since a true spherical wavefront cannot be achieved in practice, designers try to make the lobe as wide as possible at the crossover frequency, such that at typical listening positions, the speaker appears omnidirectional.

== Lobe formation ==
For the sake of simplicity, the following assumes two point sources separated by a distance d vertically^{‡}, both radiating into half-space at a certain frequency f. Thus we can express lobing as a function of d and its relation to the wavelength λ. As d becomes significant (or larger) as compared to λ, the acoustic wavefront starts becoming narrower or more directive.

The following image shows a simplified representation of how two non-coincident drivers exhibit lobing (the difference between the lobing patterns is greatly exaggerated to demonstrate the effect):

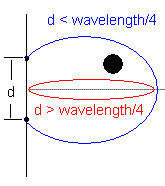

The large black dot is the vertical listening position relative to the centre, at a certain fixed horizontal distance from the speaker. For wavelengths much greater than d, the wavefront is almost spherical (circular, when seen from the side) and the sound level is constant for a variety of such listening positions - the off-axis response of the speaker is almost omnidirectional. As the distance d approaches λ/4, the wavefront starts becoming narrower. At the listening position, the sound level is not the same as it would have been, had it been exactly midway between the drivers. The area where the sound level is constant for a given range of vertical positions (and fixed listening distance) is the lobe. Outside the lobe, the sound level is much less and this is what causes the speaker to have a change in tonality as one's listening height changes.

Note: For an individual driver this effect is known as directivity, and is observable in both vertical and horizontal planes, and d is now the driver's diameter relative to the wavelength, whereas, the lobing pattern due to two or more drivers is primarily an effect in the vertical plane, as a result of the distance between the two drivers.

The physical reason for a lobe to form is the fact that at any point that is at a position unequal from both drivers, at certain frequencies (i.e., wavelengths) and depending on d and relative difference between the distances to the listening position, the wavefronts from each driver will interfere constructively or destructively. This constructive or destructive interference happens due to the relative phases of the waves from each driver as they reach the listening position.

Thus, for any given frequency, there will be a minimum distance from the speaker below which there will be radical changes in sound level as the listening position is changed vertically. And this distance becomes larger as the distance between the drivers increases. Thus, the best compromise is obtained when, for practical listening distances, we can choose drivers large enough to cover as much of the audio band as possible but at the same time small enough so they can be as closely spaced as possible as to appear as a point source for any practical listening distance.

‡ - The article assumes a typical loudspeaker configuration where multiple drivers are arranged vertically. Therefore, the lobing phenomenon is observable in the vertical plane. For horizontally arranged drivers, the lobing phenomenon would be observable in the horizontal plane.
