= Spatial music =

Composed music that intentionally exploits sound localization

Spatial music is composed music that intentionally exploits sound localization. Though present in Western music from biblical times in the form of the antiphon, as a component specific to new musical techniques the concept of spatial music (Raummusik, usually translated as "space music") was introduced as early as 1928 in Germany.

The term spatialisation is connected especially with electroacoustic music to denote the projection and localization of sound sources in physical or virtual space or sound's spatial movement in space.

== Context ==
The term "spatial music" indicates music in which the location and movement of sound sources is a primary compositional parameter and a central feature for the listener. It may involve a single, mobile sound source, or multiple, simultaneous, stationary or mobile sound events in different locations.

There are at least three distinct categories when plural events are treated spatially:

1. essentially independent events separated in space, like simultaneous concerts, each with a strong signaling character
2. one or several such signaling events, separated from more "passive" reverberating background complexes
3. separated but coordinated performing groups.

== Examples ==
Examples of spatiality include more than seventy works by Giovanni Pierluigi da Palestrina (canticles, litanies, masses, Marian antiphons, psalm- and sequence-motets), the five-choir, forty- and sixty-voice Missa sopra Ecco sì beato giorno by Alessandro Striggio and the possibly related eight-choir, forty-voice motet Spem in alium by Thomas Tallis, as well as a number of other Italian—mainly Florentine—works dating between 1557 and 1601.

Notable 20th-century spatial compositions include Charles Ives's Fourth Symphony (1912–18), Rued Langgaard's Music of the Spheres (1916–18), Edgard Varèse's Poème électronique (Expo '58), Henryk Górecki's Scontri, op. 17 (1960), which unleashes a volume of sound with a "tremendous orchestra" for which the composer precisely dictates the placement of each player onstage, including fifty-two percussion instruments, Karlheinz Stockhausen's Helicopter String Quartet (1992–93/95), which is "arguably the most extreme experiment involving the spatial motility of live performers", and Henry Brant's Ice Field, a "'spatial narrative,'" or "spatial organ concerto," awarded the 2002 Pulitzer Prize for Music, as well as most of the output after 1960 of Luigi Nono, whose late works—e.g., ... sofferte onde serene ... (1976), Al gran sole carico d'amore (1972–77), Prometeo (1984), and A Pierre: Dell'azzurro silenzio, inquietuum (1985)—explicitly reflect the spatial soundscape of his native Venice, and cannot be performed without their spatial component.

Technological developments have led to broader distribution of spatial music via smartphones since at least 2011, to include sounds experienced via Global Positioning System localization (BLUEBRAIN, Matmos, others) and visual inertial odometry through augmented reality (TCW, others).

In 2024, Julius Dobos conducted spatial composition research which resulted in the paper Spatial Composition – and What It Means for Immersive Audio Production. As part of the research, cohorts of focus groups compared alternative compositions which were created while the composer was monitoring audio in stereo and spatial systems, respectively, during the writing process. Over 150 listeners evaluated musical differences between the resulting "stereo" and "spatial" compositions while listening to both on identical playback systems, thus, removing the exhibition format variables and exclusively comparing musical content. The paper concludes: "Space is a potent and influential element to use in composition" and "while using space as a compositional element might not result in a composition objectively superior to one created without any spatial consideration, [...] space as a musical component is clearly responsible for inspiring significant enough content differences to cause some listeners to prefer the result." The paper proposes "the widespread acceptance of space as a compositional element of music" and urges the prioritization of conceptual spatial choices made by music composers over spatial mixing choices made by mixing engineers during audio production. Dobos presented his research and demonstrated the results to the Recording Academy and the Audio Engineering Society at Dolby Labs' headquarters in October, 2025, as well as at the 159th International Convention of the AES, proposing again the acceptance of space as the 5th element in music and music composition.

== See also ==
- 5.1 surround sound
- 3D audio effect
- Ambisonics
- Auditory spatial attention
- Audium (theater)
- Directional sound
- Dolby Atmos
- Holophones
- Octophonic sound
- Planephones
- Quadraphonic sound
- Stereophonic sound
- Surround sound
- Ton de Leeuw
- Venetian polychoral style
- Venetian School (music)
- Wave field synthesis
