= Whispering gallery =

Room in which sound echoes and is magnified in an unusual way

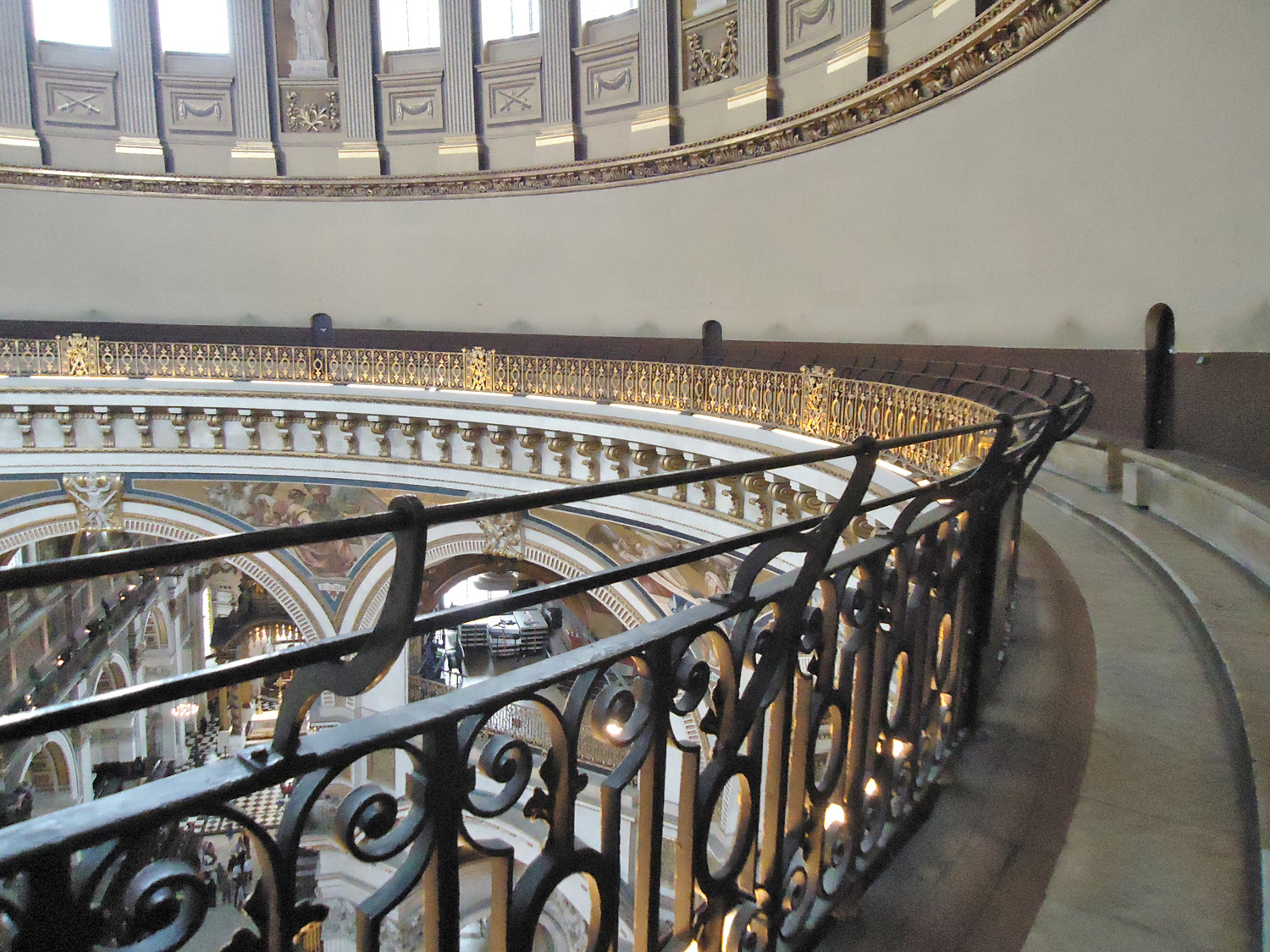
The Whispering Gallery of St Paul's Cathedral, London

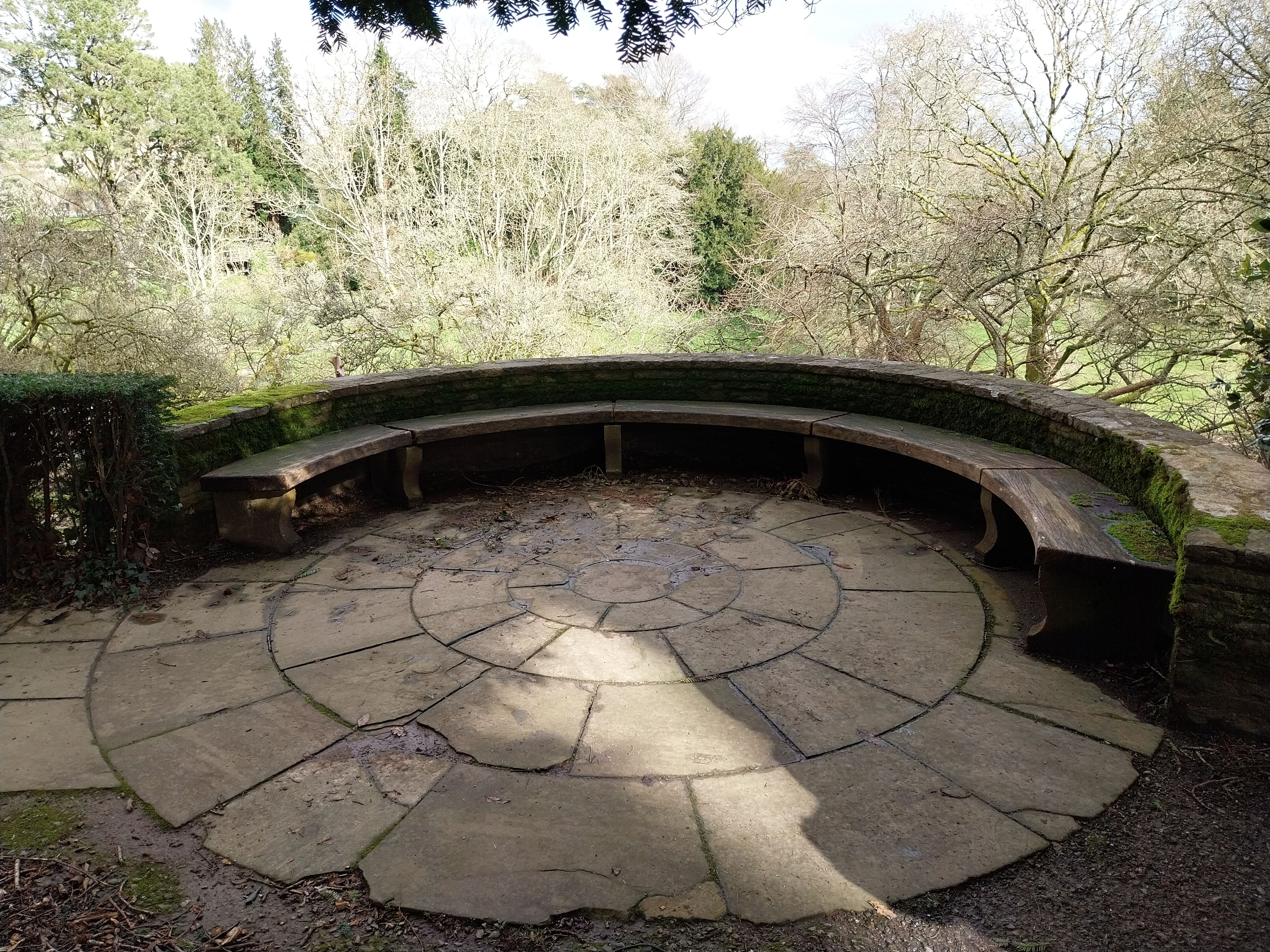
A whispering circle in Dartington Estate (Devon, England).

A whispering gallery is usually a circular, hemispherical, elliptical or ellipsoidal enclosure, often beneath a dome or a vault, in which whispers can be heard clearly in other parts of the gallery. Such galleries can also be set up using two parabolic dishes. Sometimes the phenomenon is detected in caves.

== Theory ==
A whispering gallery is most simply constructed in the form of a circular wall, and allows whispered communication from any part of the internal side of the circumference to any other part. The sound is carried by waves, known as whispering-gallery waves, that travel around the circumference clinging to the walls, an effect that was discovered in the whispering gallery of St Paul's Cathedral in London. The extent to which the sound travels at St Paul's can also be judged by clapping in the gallery, which produces four echoes. Other historical examples are the Gol Gumbaz mausoleum in Bijapur, India and the Echo Wall of the Temple of Heaven in Beijing. A hemispherical enclosure will also guide whispering gallery waves. The waves carry the words so that others will be able to hear them from the opposite side of the gallery.

The gallery may also be in the form of an ellipse or ellipsoid, with an accessible point at each focus. In this case, when a visitor stands at one focus and whispers, the line of sound emanating from this focus reflects directly to the focus at the other end of the gallery, where the whispers may be heard. In a similar way, two large concave parabolic dishes, serving as acoustic mirrors, may be erected facing each other in a room or outdoors to serve as a whispering gallery, a common feature of science museums. Egg-shaped galleries, such as the Golghar Granary at Bankipore, and irregularly shaped smooth-walled galleries in the form of caves, such as the Ear of Dionysius in Syracuse, also exist.

== Examples ==
=== India ===
- The Gol Gumbaz in Bijapur, India.
- The Golghar Granary in Bankipore, India.
- The Victoria Memorial in Kolkata.

=== United Kingdom ===
- St Paul's Cathedral in London is the place where whispering-gallery waves were first discovered by Lord Rayleigh c. 1878.
- Gloucester Cathedral has a whispering gallery.
- The Berkeley Wetherspoons Bristol has a whispering gallery.

=== United States ===
- Grand Central Terminal in New York City: a landing amid the Oyster Bar ramps, in front of the Oyster Bar restaurant
- Statuary Hall in the United States Capitol.
- Salt Lake Tabernacle in Salt Lake City, Utah
- Centennial fountain in front of Green Library at Stanford University in California
- Gates Circle, Buffalo, New York
- The Whispering Arch in St. Louis Union Station
- Charles Stover Bench, Central Park, New York, New York
- Waldo Hutchins Bench, Central Park, New York, New York
- Whispering Gallery, Museum of Science and Industry (Chicago)

=== Other parts of the world ===
- The Echo Wall in the Temple of Heaven in Beijing.
- Basilica of St. John Lateran, Rome.
- The Salle des Caryatides in the Louvre, Paris, France.
- Ear of Dionysius cave in Syracuse, Sicily.
- Palazzo del Podestà, Bologna, Italy.
- Banco dos Namorados (Lovers' bench) in Santiago de Compostela, Spain.

== In science ==
The term whispering gallery has been borrowed in the physical sciences to describe other forms of whispering-gallery waves such as light or matter waves.

== See also ==
- Acoustic mirror
- Parabolic loudspeaker
- Room acoustics
