= Whispering-gallery wave =

Wave that can travel around a concave surface

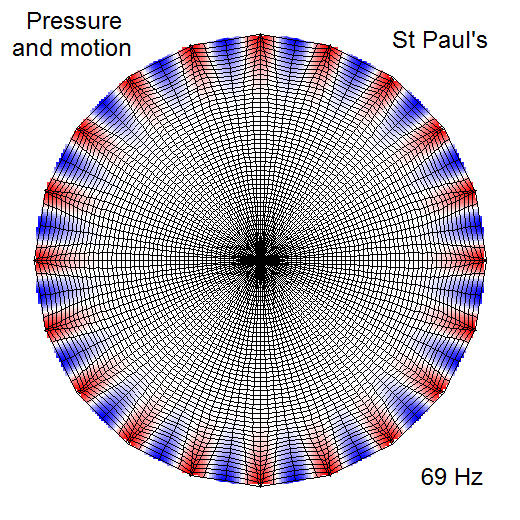
Snapshot of an acoustic whispering-gallery mode calculated at a frequency of 69 Hz in an enclosed cylinder of air of the same diameter (33.7 m) as the whispering gallery in St Paul's Cathedral. Red and blue represent higher and lower air pressures, respectively, and the distortions in the grid lines show the displacements. In the case of the waves travelling one way round the gallery, the air particles move in elliptical trajectories.

Whispering-gallery waves, or whispering-gallery modes, are a type of wave that can travel around a concave surface. Originally discovered for sound waves in the whispering gallery of St Paul's Cathedral, they can exist for light and for other waves, with important applications in nondestructive testing, lasing, cooling and sensing, as well as in astronomy.

== Introduction ==
Whispering-gallery waves were first explained for the case of St Paul's Cathedral circa 1878 by Lord Rayleigh, who revised a previous misconception that whispers could be heard across the dome but not at any intermediate position. He explained the phenomenon of travelling whispers with a series of specularly reflected sound rays making up chords of the circular gallery. Clinging to the walls the sound should decay in intensity only as the inverse of the distance — rather than the inverse square as in the case of a point source of sound radiating in all directions. This accounts for the whispers being audible all round the gallery.

Rayleigh developed wave theories for St Paul's in 1910 and 1914. Fitting sound waves inside a cavity involves the physics of resonance based on wave interference; the sound can exist only at certain pitches as in the case of organ pipes. The sound forms patterns called modes, as shown in the diagram.

Many other monuments have been shown to exhibit whispering-gallery waves, such as the Gol Gumbaz in Bijapur and the Temple of Heaven in Beijing.

== Acoustic waves ==
Whispering-gallery waves for sound exist in a wide variety of systems. Examples include the vibrations of the whole Earth or stars.

Such acoustic whispering-gallery waves can be used in nondestructive testing in the form of waves that creep around holes filled with liquid, for example. They have also been detected in solid cylinders and spheres, with applications in sensing, and visualized in motion on microscopic discs .

Whispering gallery waves are more efficiently guided in spheres than in cylinders because the effects of acoustic diffraction (lateral wave spreading) are then completely compensated.

== Electromagnetic waves ==
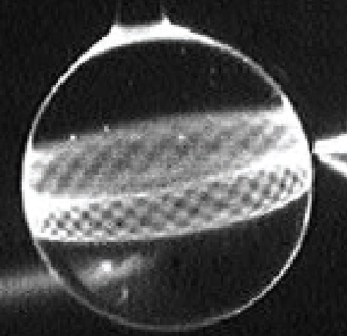
Optical whispering-gallery modes in a glass sphere of diameter 300 μm experimentally imaged with a fluorescence technique. The tip of an angle-cut optical fiber, visible on the right, excites the modes in the red region of the optical spectrum.

Whispering-gallery waves exist for light waves. They have been produced in microscopic glass spheres or tori and in soap bubbles, for example, with applications as optical resonators for lasing, optomechanical cooling, frequency comb generation and optical sensing. The light waves are guided around almost perfectly by total internal reflection, leading to Q factors in excess of 10^{10} being achieved. This is far greater than the best values, about 10^{4}, that can be obtained in acoustics. Optical modes in a whispering gallery resonator experience some loss due to a mechanism similar to quantum tunneling, even in theoretically ideal conditions. This loss has been known from research on optical waveguide theory and is dubbed tunneling ray attenuation in the field of fiber optics. The Q factor is proportional to the decay time of the waves, which in turn is inversely proportional to both the surface scattering rate and the wave absorption in the medium making up the gallery. Whispering-gallery waves for light have been investigated in chaotic galleries, whose cross-sections deviate from a circle. Such waves have been used in quantum information applications.

Whispering-gallery waves have also been demonstrated for other electromagnetic waves such as radio waves, microwaves, terahertz radiation, infrared radiation, ultraviolet waves and x-rays. More recently, with the rapid development of microfluidic technologies, many integrated whispering gallery mode sensors have emerged, which combine the portability of lab‐on‐chip devices and the high sensitivity of whispering gallery mode resonators. The capabilities of efficient sample handling and multiplexed analyte detection offered by these systems have led to many biological and chemical sensing applications, especially for the detection of a single particle or biomolecule.

== Other systems ==
Whispering-gallery waves have been seen in the form of matter waves for neutrons, and electrons, and they have been proposed as an explanation for vibrations of a single nucleus. Whispering gallery waves have also been observed in the vibrations of soap films as well as in the vibrations of thin plates Analogies of whispering-gallery waves also exist for gravitational waves at the event horizon of black holes. A hybrid of waves of light and electrons known as surface plasmons has been demonstrated in the form of whispering-gallery waves, and likewise for exciton-polaritons in semiconductors. Galleries simultaneously containing both acoustic and optical whispering-gallery waves have also been made, exhibiting very strong mode coupling and coherent effects. Hybrid solid-fluid-optical whispering-gallery structures have been observed as well.

== See also ==
- Whispering gallery
- Optical ring resonator
- Resonator
- Architectural acoustics
