= Parametric array =

Nonlinear transduction mechanism

A parametric array, in the field of acoustics, is a nonlinear transduction mechanism that generates narrow, nearly side lobe-free beams of low frequency sound, through the mixing and interaction of high frequency sound waves, effectively overcoming the diffraction limit (a kind of spatial 'uncertainty principle') associated with linear acoustics. The main side lobe-free beam of low frequency sound is created as a result of nonlinear mixing of two high frequency sound beams at their difference frequency. Parametric arrays can be formed in water, air, and earth materials/rock.

== History ==
Priority for discovery and explanation of the parametric array owes to Peter J. Westervelt, winner of the Lord Rayleigh Medal, although important experimental work was contemporaneously underway in the former Soviet Union.

According to Muir and Albers, the concept for the parametric array occurred to Dr. Westervelt while he was stationed at the London, England, branch office of the Office of Naval Research in 1951.

According to Albers, he (Westervelt) there first observed an accidental generation of low frequency sound in air by Captain H.J. Round (British pioneer of the superheterodyne receiver) via the parametric array mechanism.

The phenomenon of the parametric array, seen first experimentally by Westervelt in the 1950s, was later explained theoretically in 1960, at a meeting of the Acoustical Society of America. A few years after this, a full paper was published as an extension of Westervelt's classic work on the nonlinear Scattering of Sound by Sound.

== Foundations ==
The foundation for Westervelt's theory of sound generation and scattering in nonlinear acoustic media owes to an application of Lighthill's equation for fluid particle motion.

The application of Lighthill’s theory to the nonlinear acoustic realm yields the Westervelt–Lighthill Equation (WLE). Solutions to this equation have been developed using Green's functions and Parabolic Equation (PE) Methods, most notably via the Kokhlov–Zablotskaya–Kuznetzov (KZK) equation.

An alternate mathematical formalism using Fourier operator methods in wavenumber space, was also developed and generalized by Westervelt. The solution method is formulated in Fourier (wavenumber) space in a representation related to the beam patterns of the primary fields generated by linear sources in the medium. This formalism has been applied not only to parametric arrays, but also to other nonlinear acoustic effects, such as the absorption of sound by sound and to the equilibrium distribution of sound intensity spectra in cavities.

== Applications ==
Practical applications are numerous and include:

- underwater sound
  - sonar
  - depth sounding
  - sub-bottom profiling
  - non-destructive testing
  - and 'see through walls' sensing
  - remote ocean sensing
- medical ultrasound
- and tomography
- underground seismic prospecting
- active noise control
- and directional high-fidelity commercial audio systems (Sound from ultrasound)

Parametric receiving arrays can also be formed for directional reception. In 2005, Elwood Norris won the $500,000 MIT-Lemelson Prize for his application of the parametric array to commercial high-fidelity loudspeakers.
