= Modulated ultrasound =

Technology for transmitting signals through water

Modulated ultrasound is a form of underwater acoustic communication in which information (such as voice or data) is transmitted through water by modulating an acoustic carrier signal. Early practical systems included underwater telephone equipment for ship-to-submarine communication, which used single-sideband suppressed-carrier amplitude modulation in the kilohertz frequency range.

Some underwater telephone equipment (e.g., AN/UQC-1) specified an operational voice frequency band around 8–11 kHz and reported an approximate range on the order of miles under favorable conditions, reflecting the short-to-medium range typical for practical voice underwater acoustics in real environments. The received signal is demodulated (decoded) into audible sound or other information by a compatible receiver, in a manner analogous to demodulation in radio communications.

Applications include use in underwater diver communication systems (“through-water” communications) and communication with submarines and other subsea assets.

== Range limitation ==
In seawater, acoustic absorption (attenuation) increases strongly with frequency, which limits the practical range of higher-frequency (including ultrasonic) underwater transmission. Higher frequencies generally suffer greater absorption and therefore fade more rapidly with distance than lower-frequency sound.

Because of this, practical underwater voice systems historically used carrier frequencies in the low-kilohertz region (for example, around 8–11 kHz in early underwater telephone implementations) rather than ultrasonic frequencies, achieving communication distances on the order of several kilometers under suitable conditions.

== See also ==
- Sound from ultrasound – use of non-linear effects to make ultrasound-carried signals audible without a conventional receiver
- Underwater acoustic communication
- Diver communications
