= Planephones =

Category of musical art installation

Planephones, or planofoni, represent an innovative sound art creation. They are vibrating systems based on wood panels (or other materials) and different forms. Planephones diffuse the sound according to specifications which depend on the structure of the material, on the geometry of the design, on the orientation and curvature of the surfaces, and on the plastic volumes occupied.

Planephones differ from conventional sound diffusion systems in that the sound acquires the timbral quality of the material employed and, in addition, by diffusing the sound homogeneously along the surface, permits designing the acoustic space. according to the architectural space.

Planephones were conceived by composer Michelangelo Lupone, as art installations (1997), and are the result of studies on the vibrational qualities of materials with the collaboration of CRM-Centro Ricerche Musicali.

Planephones are works of art which integrate form, matter, sound, music language and expression. They integrate the relevant aspects of sound and visual perception, creating new modes of fruition of the work of art.

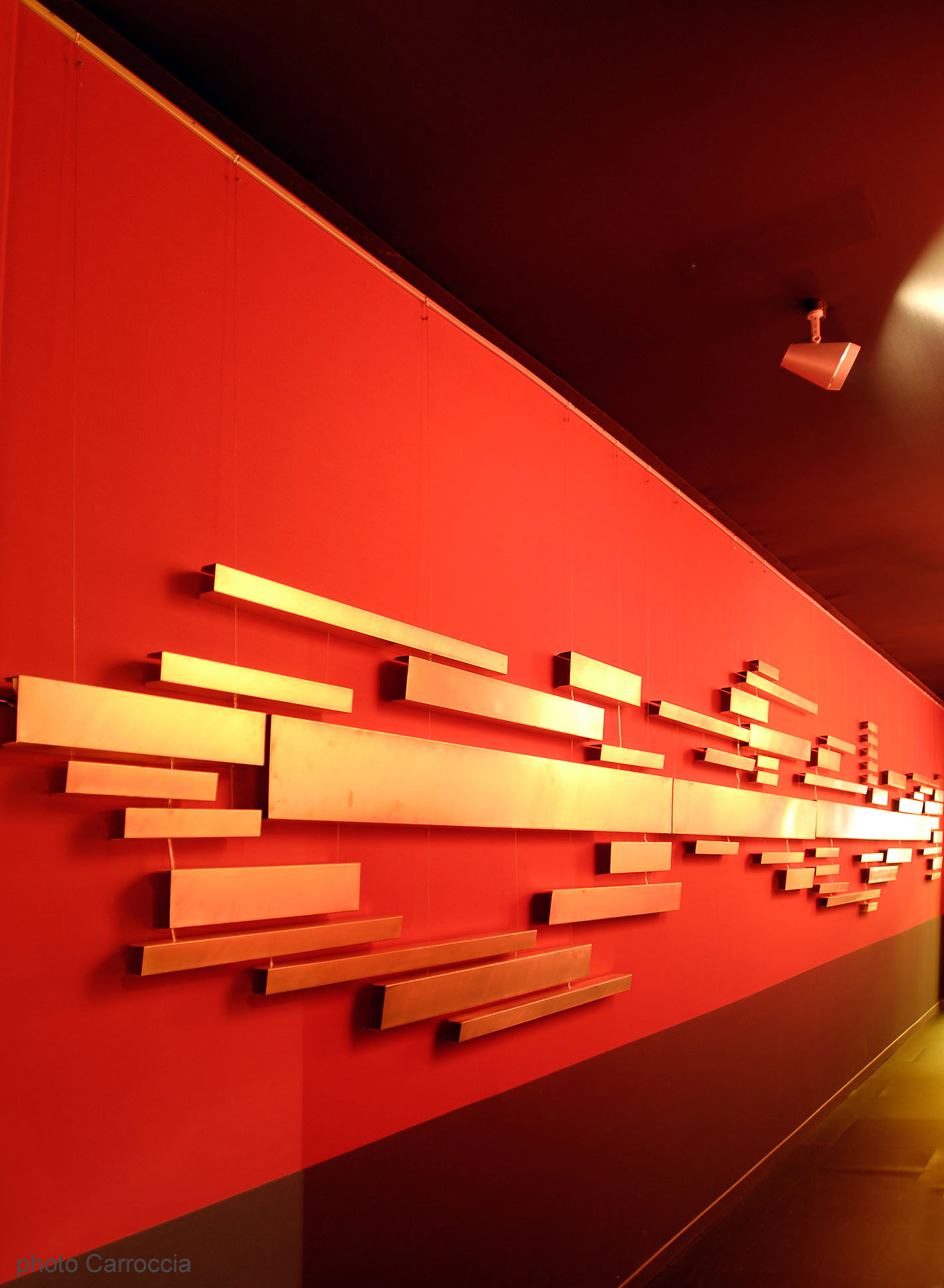

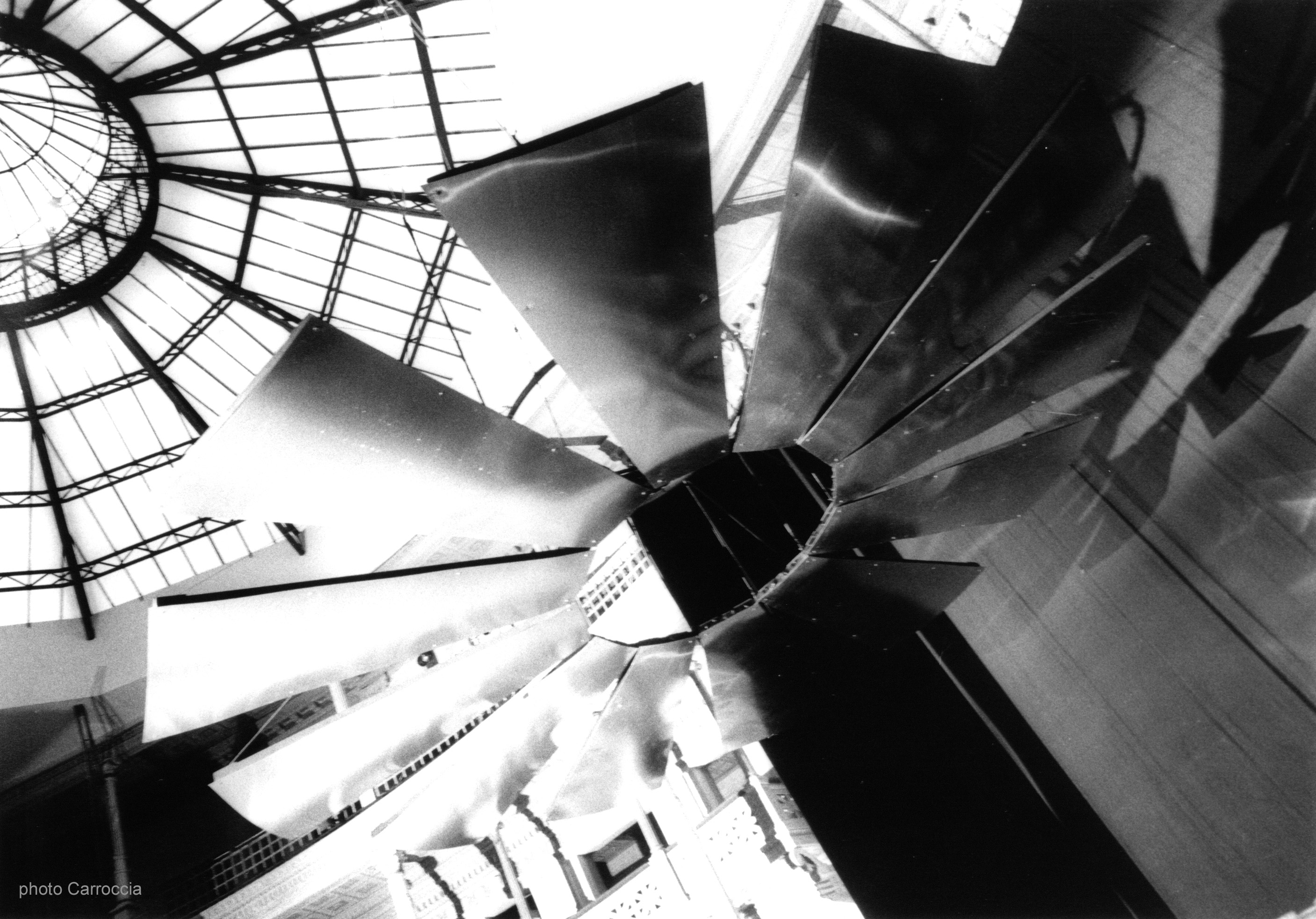

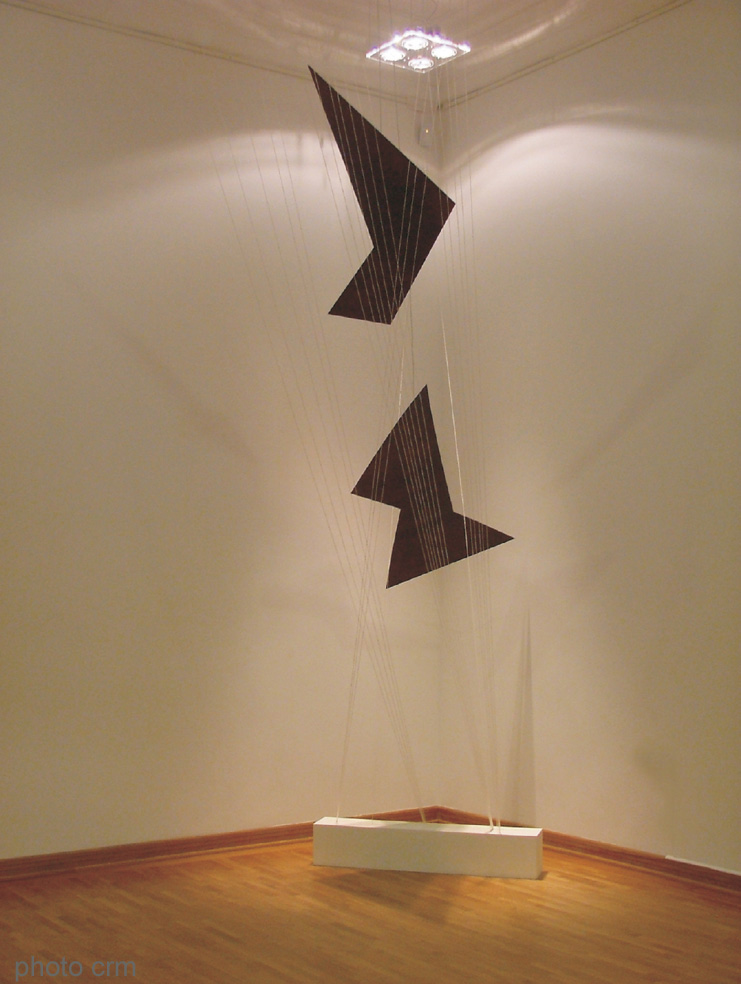

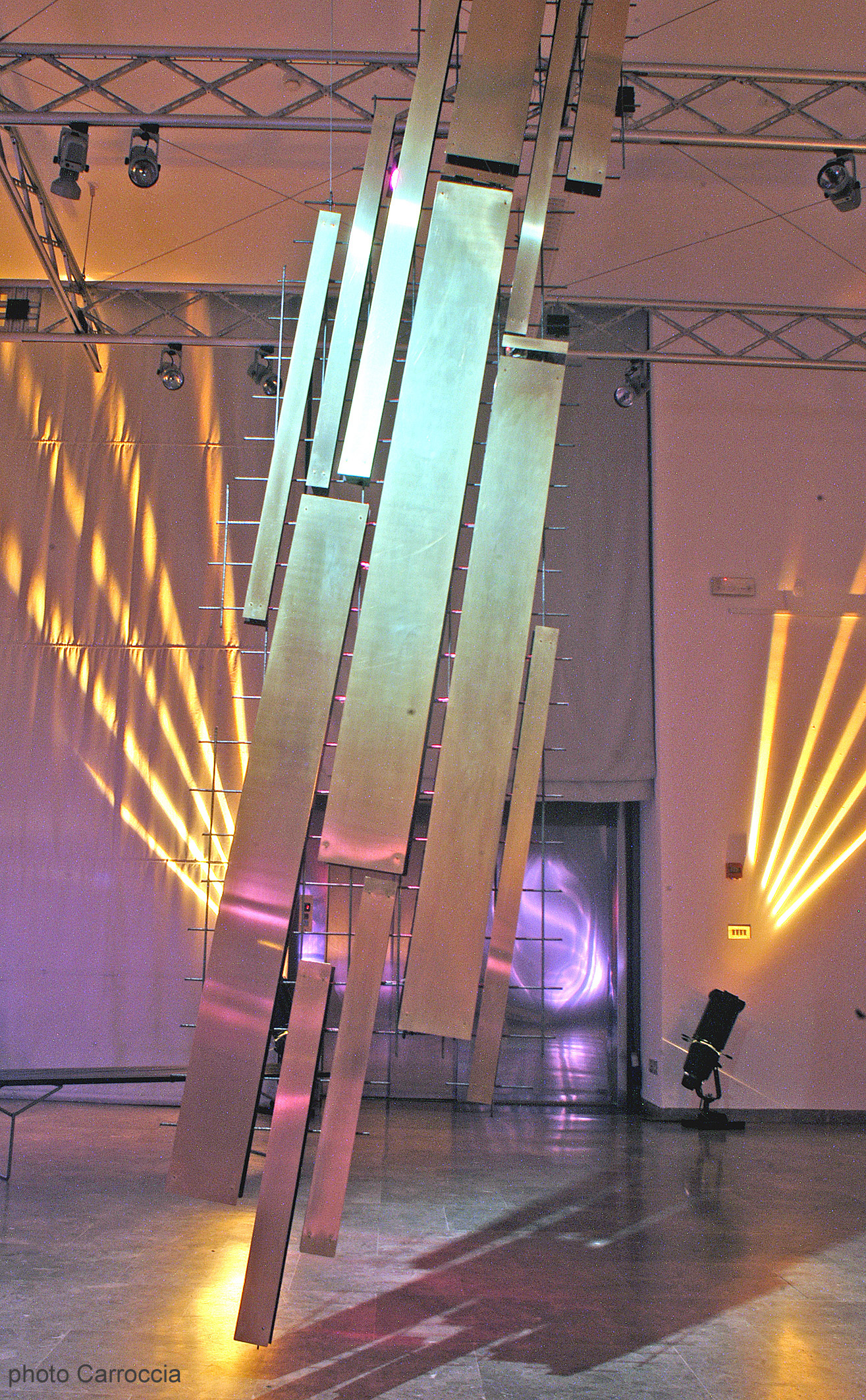

== See also ==
- Holophones
- Feed-Drum
