= Whispering =

Speech without vocal cord vibration

Whispery

◌̣

Encoding
- Entity (decimal): &#803;
- Unicode (hex): U+0323

Whispering

Whispering is an unvoiced mode of phonation in which the vocal cords are abducted so that they do not vibrate; air passes between the arytenoid cartilages to create audible turbulence during speech. Supralaryngeal articulation remains the same as in normal speech.

In normal speech, the vocal cords alternate between states of voice and voicelessness. In whispering, only the voicing segments change, so that the vocal cords alternate between whisper and voicelessness (though the acoustic difference between the two states is minimal). Because of this, implementing speech recognition for whispered speech is more difficult, as the characteristic spectral range needed to detect syllables and words is not given through the total absence of tone. More advanced techniques such as neural networks may be used, however, as is done by Amazon Alexa.

There is no symbol in the IPA for whispered phonation, since it is not used phonemically in any language. However, a sub-dot under phonemically voiced segments is sometimes seen in the literature, as [ʃʊ̣ḍ] for whispered should.

== Social role ==
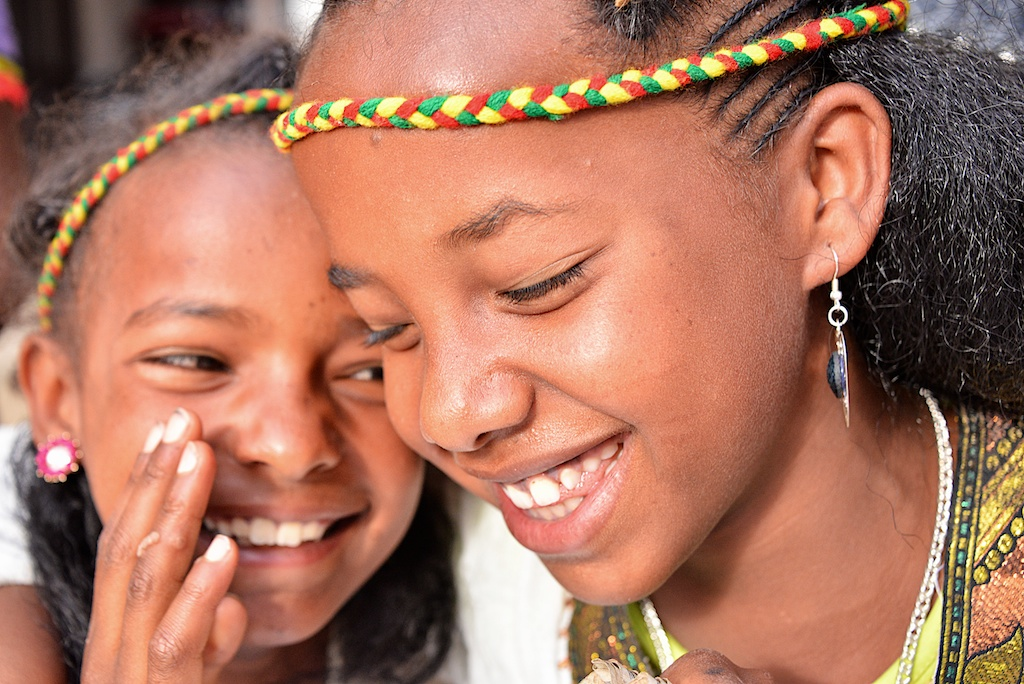
A girl whispers to another girl.

Whispering is generally used quietly, to limit the hearing of speech to those closest to the speaker; for example, to convey secret information without being overheard or to avoid disturbing others in a quiet place such as a library or place of worship. Loud whispering, known as an stage whisper, is generally used only for dramatic or emphatic purposes. Whispering can strain the vocal cords more than regular speech in some people, for whom speaking softly is recommended instead.

== ASMR ==
An ASMR video wherein the performer whispers to the camera

In 2010, it was discovered that whispering is one of the many triggers of ASMR, a tingling sensation caused by listening to soft, relaxing sounds. This phenomenon made news headlines after videos on YouTube of people speaking up close to the camera in a soft whisper, giving the viewer tingles. People often listen to these videos to help them sleep and to relax.

== In non-humans ==
The prevalence and function of low-amplitude signaling by non-humans are poorly characterized. As such, it is difficult to ascertain the existence of whispering in non-humans. This is made more difficult by the specific physiology of human whispering. By sufficiently relaxing the definition of whispering, it can be argued any number of non-human species demonstrate whisper-like behaviors. Often these behaviors function to increase fitness.

If whispering is more broadly defined as the "production of short-range, low-amplitude acoustic signals," whispering is observed in myriad animals including non-human mammals, fish, and insects.

If whispering is restricted to include only acoustic signals which significantly differ from those produced at high amplitude, whispering is still observed across biological taxa. An unlikely example is the croaking gourami. Croaking gouramis produce a high-amplitude "croak" during agonistic disputes by beating specialized pectoral fins. Female gouramis additionally use these fins to produce an acoustically distinct, low-amplitude "purr" during copulation.

If whispering is restricted to include only creatures possessing vocal folds (i.e., mammals and some reptiles), whispering has been observed in species including cotton-top tamarins and a variety of bats. In captive cotton-top tamarins, whisper-like behavior is speculated to enable troop communication while not alerting predators. (Note: The low-amplitude vocalizations of cotton-top tamarins are believed to be an alternative to high-amplitude mobbing calls. If true, both vocalizations would be distinct instances of anti-predator adaptations.) Numerous species of bats (e.g., spotted bats, northern long-eared bats, and western barbastelles) alter their echolocation calls (Note: These alterations come at the cost of spatial awareness.) to avoid detection by prey. (Note: All mentioned species of bats prey on eared moths.)

Such a relaxed definition of whispering (i.e., production of short-range, low-amplitude acoustic signals which significantly differ from those produced at high amplitude) cannot be applied to humans without including vocalizations distinct from human whispering (e.g., creaky voice, and falsetto). Further research is needed to ascertain the existence of whispering in non-humans as established in the larger article.

== See also ==
- Aspiration (phonetics)
- Chinese whispers
- Cocktail party effect
- Egressive sound vs. ingressive speech
- Whispering campaign
- Whispering gallery
- Whispery voice
- Other forms of unvoiced vocalization: gasping, sighing and panting
- Autonomous sensory meridian response
