= Directional sound =

Fields of sound which spread less than most transmissions

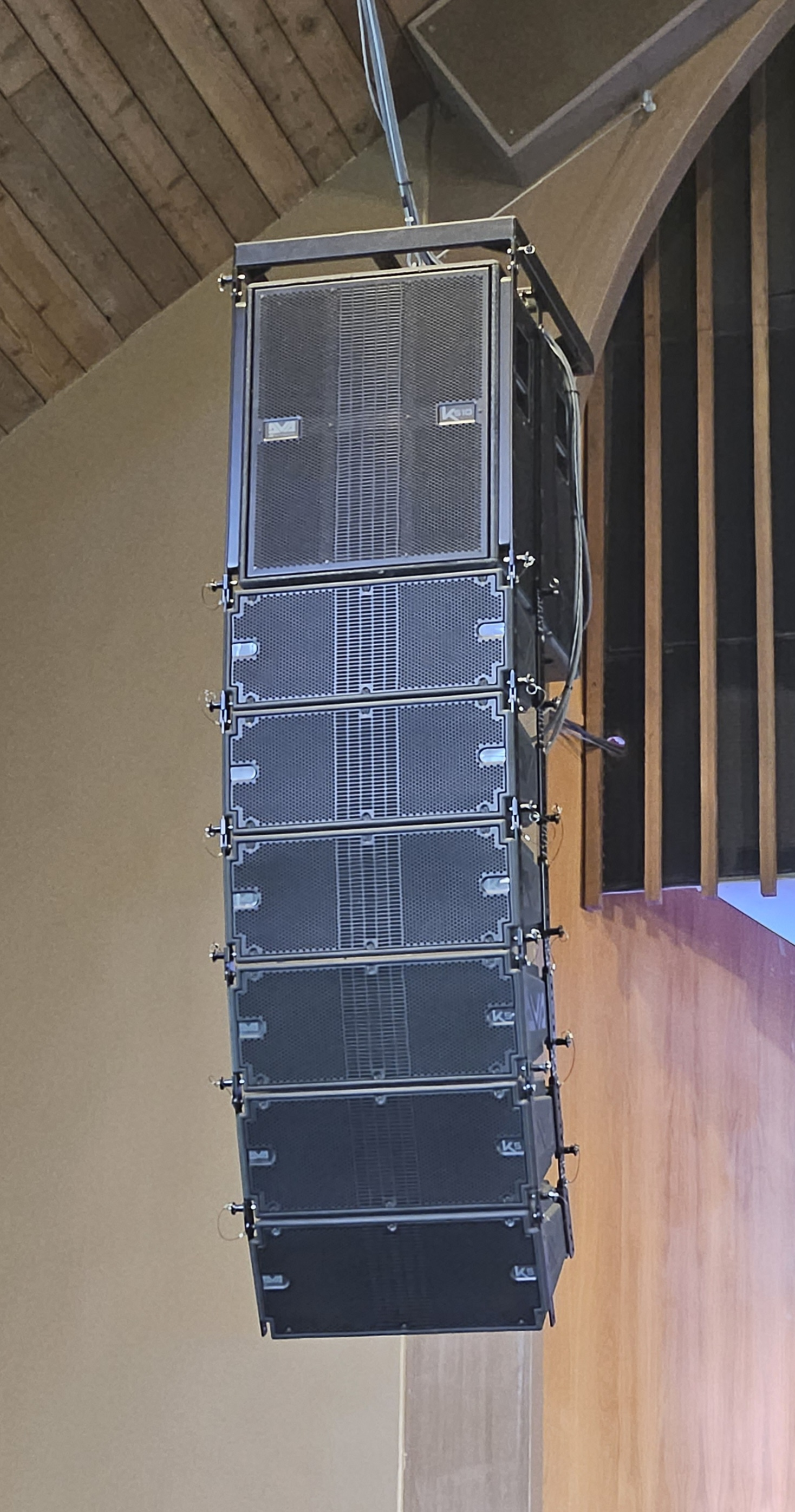
Line array of speakers

Directional sound refers to the notion of using various devices to create fields of sound which spread less than most (small) traditional loudspeakers. Several techniques are available to accomplish this, and each has its benefits and drawbacks. Ultimately, choosing a directional sound device depends greatly on the environment in which it is deployed as well as the content that will be reproduced. Keeping these factors in mind will yield the best results through any evaluation of directional sound technologies.

Systems which guide evacuees during an emergency by the emission of pink noise to the exits are often also called "directional sound" systems.

== Basic theory ==
In all wave-producing sources, the directivity of any source, at maximum, corresponds to the size of the source compared to the wavelengths it is generating: The larger the source is compared to the wavelength of the sound waves, the more directional beam results. The specific transduction method has no impact on the directivity of the resulting sound field; the analysis relies only on the aperture function of the source, per the Huygens–Fresnel principle.

The ultrasonic devices achieve high directivity by modulating audible sound onto high frequency ultrasound. The higher frequency sound waves have a shorter wavelength and thus don't spread out as rapidly. For this reason, the resulting directivity of these devices is far higher than physically possible with any loudspeaker system. However, they are reported to have limited low-frequency reproduction abilities. See sound from ultrasound for more information.

== Speaker arrays ==
Sound from an array spreads less than sound from a point source, by the Huygens–Fresnel principle applied to diffraction.

While a large loudspeaker is naturally more directional because of its large size, a source with equivalent directivity can be made by utilizing an array of traditional small loudspeakers, all driven together in-phase. Acoustically equal to a large speaker, this creates a larger source size compared to wavelength, and the resulting sound field is narrowed compared to a single small speaker. Large speaker arrays have been used in hundreds of arena sound systems to mitigate noise that would ordinarily travel to adjoining neighborhoods, along with limited applications in other applications where some degree of directivity is helpful, such as museums or similar display applications that can tolerate large speaker dimensions.

Traditional speaker arrays can be fabricated in any shape or size, but a reduced physical dimension (relative to wavelength) will inherently sacrifice directivity in that dimension. The larger the speaker array, the more directional, and the smaller the size of the speaker array, the less directional it is. This is fundamental physics, and cannot be bypassed, even by using phased arrays or other signal processing methods. This is because the directivity pattern of any wave source is the Fourier Transform of the source function. Phased array design is, however, sometimes useful for beamsteering, or for sidelobe mitigation, but making these compromises necessarily reduces directivity.

Acoustically, speaker arrays are essentially the same as sound domes, which have also been available for decades; the size of the dome opening mimics the acoustic properties of a large speaker of the same diameter (or, equivalently, a large speaker array of the same diameter). Domes, however, tend to weigh much less than the weight of comparable speaker arrays (15 lbs vs. 37 lbs, per the manufacturer's websites), and are far less expensive.

Other types of large speaker panels, such as electrostatic loudspeakers, tend to be more directional than small speakers, for the same reasons as above; they are somewhat more directional only because they tend to be physically larger than most common loudspeakers. Correspondingly, an electrostatic loudspeaker the size of a small traditional speaker would be non-directional.

The directivity for various source sizes and shapes is given in. The directivity is shown to be a function only of the source size and shape, not of the specific type of transducer used.

== See also ==
- Loudspeaker
- Parabolic loudspeaker
- Sonic weaponry
- Sound from ultrasound
