= Parabolic loudspeaker =

Parabolic-shaped speaker producing coherent plane waves

A parabolic loudspeaker is a loudspeaker which seeks to focus its sound in coherent plane waves either by reflecting sound output from a speaker driver to a parabolic reflector aimed at the target audience, or by arraying drivers on a parabolic surface. The resulting beam of sound travels farther, with less dissipation in air, than horn loudspeakers, and can be more focused than line array loudspeakers allowing sound to be sent to isolated audience targets. The parabolic loudspeaker has been used for such diverse purposes as directing sound at faraway targets in performing arts centers and stadia, for industrial testing, for intimate listening at museum exhibits, and as a sonic weapon.

== Technology ==
A parabolic loudspeaker can send sound farther than traditional loudspeaker designs. The focused waves of a parabolic loudspeaker tend to dissipate in air at about 3 dB SPL per doubling of distance, rather than the usual 6 dB of conventional loudspeakers.

=== Parabolic reflector ===
In a parabolic reflecting loudspeaker, one or more speaker drivers are mounted at the focal point of a parabola, facing away from the audience, toward the parabolic surface. The sound is bounced off the parabolic dish and leaves the dish focused in plane waves. The lowest frequency that can be directed into a narrow beam is dependent on the size of the parabolic dish. A parabolic reflector type of loudspeaker must have a diameter twice that of the wavelength of the lowest desired frequency, so to obtain directional control of frequencies down to 20 Hz, the dish would have to be over 113 feet (34 m) wide.

Limitations of parabolic reflector loudspeakers include the fact that they are comparatively large and bulky, and also have a fixed beam width with no ability to broaden or narrow the coverage pattern without changing the curvature of the dish. Their beam width is wider for low frequencies than it is for high frequencies, so at the periphery of the coverage pattern there is a region of sound coverage that does not receive the full strength of the high frequencies. In addition, some frequencies are reflected more efficiently than others, so the frequency response is uneven unless audio signal processing correction is applied before the signal reaches the amplifier. The presence and placement of the speaker driver prevents the center of the parabolic dish from reflecting sound outward, as that sound would reflect back into the speaker driver itself. In some loudspeaker designs, a hole is cut at the center of the parabolic dish, or damping material placed, such that no sound is reflected directly at the speaker driver.

=== Parabolic source ===
A loudspeaker can be constructed with multiple speaker drivers arrayed on the surface of a parabolic dish. This type of loudspeaker does not reflect sound—it aims sound directly at the audience. As in non-parabolic arrays of drivers, the signal going to each of the multiple drivers can be digitally delayed relative to its neighbors to achieve beam steering, and thus to adjust the aiming point or coverage pattern of the parabolic array without physically changing its position or curvature.

The expense of a multiple driver loudspeaker is typically higher than a reflector-type parabolic dish due to the increased number of speaker driver components and amplifier channels.

== Sonic weapon ==
The first use of a parabolic reflector in directing sound energy as a weapon was the Luftkanone designed by the German military during World War II. Its purpose was to emit a focused pulse of sonic energy directed from the ground to aircraft overhead, and to knock the aircraft out of the sky. The system for creating a shock wave of sonic energy relied on the combustion of methane and oxygen, with a frequency range of 800–1500 pulses per second. The parabolic reflector was 3.2 metres (10.5 ft) in diameter. It failed as a weapon, primarily because its range was not sufficient.

Modern sonic weapons such as the Long Range Acoustic Device (LRAD) rely on multiple loudspeaker drivers for increased sound power, and may array them in a flat plane rather than on a parabolic surface. Such weapons do not use parabolic reflectors which necessarily limit the number of drivers—a large area of drivers aimed at the reflector would occlude the parabolic dish.

== Museum exhibits ==
Since 1986, parabolic loudspeakers have been designed to give museum exhibits a very focused sound field so that each exhibit can send sound to just one or two museum-goers without having too much interference and an increase in background noise. A typical installation involves one parabolic dish hanging above the area where people would be standing—sound is directed straight down. Some designs use a dual-focus dish to expand the sound field slightly beyond an ideal plane wave, while others incorporate dual drivers and amplifiers in a hemispheric dome to achieve a degree of stereophonic sound at the listener. Further uses for this kind of loudspeaker include video games and computer kiosks at trade shows and video arcades.

== Public address ==
In 1997, Meyer Sound Laboratories produced the SB-1, a 54-inch (1,370 mm) parabolic reflector loudspeaker intended for public address and as a supplement to conventional horn-loaded sound reinforcement systems, for "spotlight" long-throw applications. Its frequency response was 500–15,000 Hz; the region below 500 Hz was to be covered by other loudspeaker types. The sound wave output was not perfectly planar—it spread out at a narrow 10° angle and at 300 feet (91 m), the area of coverage was a circle 53 feet (16 m) in diameter, with 110 dB SPL reported at that distance by an independent critic. The SB-1 was designed to direct 100 dB SPL 500 feet (152 m), or 116 dB SPL 420 feet (128 m), depending on atmospheric conditions, and eliminate the need for delay speakers.

In 2002, Meyer Sound produced the SB-2, a bi-amplified loudspeaker which uses a parabolic dish as the front face of the enclosure. Slightly smaller than the SB-1, the SB-2 uses 28 4-inch (102 mm) drivers arrayed on the surface of the parabola combined with a coaxial horn with a 2-inch (51 mm) throat and a 4-inch (102 mm) voice coil. Similar to the SB-1, the SB-2 preserves pattern control from 500 Hz up to 16 kHz, with a 20° angle of dispersion, complemented by more widely dispersed low frequency sound down to 130 Hz. The loudspeaker was designed for permanent installation in high-ceilinged buildings such as exhibition centers and airports.

== Industrial testing ==
A parabolic loudspeaker can be used to test the sound-damping characteristics of materials used for soundproofing. A parabolic loudspeaker is aimed at the material under test, and a parabolic microphone is used to pick up the sound detected on the other side of the material. The difference between the emitted sound and the picked up sound is analyzed to determine the sound-damping qualities of the material. The narrow directionality of the parabolic loudspeaker and microphone aid in reducing the amount of stray sound that could skew test results.

== Sound sculpture ==
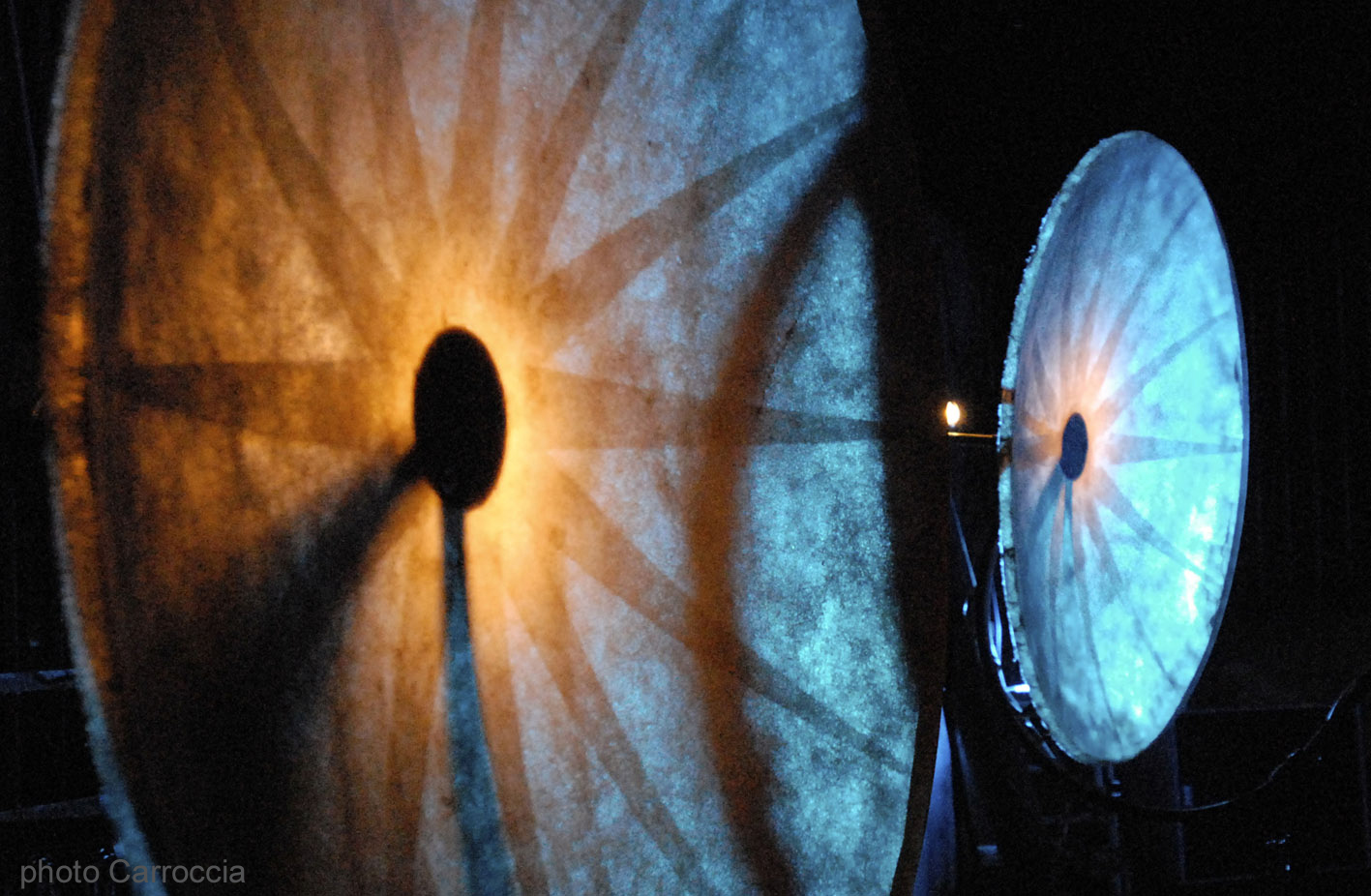
Two units of a Holophones system

The Holophones loudspeaker system was designed in 1999 by composer Michelangelo Lupone and realized at CRM – Centro Ricerche Musicali in Rome, in order to realize a specific sound spatialization defined as "wavefront sculpture". The parabolic reflector of the Holophones system emits plane waves. Each unit of the Holophones system consists of a parabolic dish with a limited band loudspeaker at its focal point, with controllable radiation angle. The dynamic controls for sculpturing the wavefront are managed by a computer.

== Patents ==
- US patent 3997023, Stanley F. White, "Loudspeaker with improved surround", issued 1976-12-14
- US patent 5821470, Stanley F. White, "Loudspeaker with improved surround", issued 1976-12-14
- US application 20,070,201,711. John D. Meyer, Perrin Meyer, Roger Schwenke, Alejandro Antonio Garcia Rubio: Loudspeaker system and method for producing a controllable synthesized sound field

== See also ==
- Directional sound
