= Acoustic camera =

Imaging device for sound sources

A sound visualization of an acoustic camera that was catching sounds from two african elephants.

An acoustic camera (or noise camera) is an imaging device used to locate sound sources and to characterize them. It consists of a group of microphones, also called a microphone array, from which signals are simultaneously collected and processed to form a representation of the location of the sound sources.

== Terminology ==
The term acoustic camera has first appeared at the end of the 19th century: A physiologist, J.R. Ewald, was investigating the function of the inner ear and introduced an analogy with the Chladni plates, a domain called Cymatics, a device enabling users to visually see the modes of vibration of a plate. He called this device an acoustic camera. The term was widely used during the 20th century to designate types of acoustic devices, such as underwater localization systems or active systems used in medicine. It now designates any transducer array used to localize sound sources (the medium is usually the air), especially when coupled with an optical camera.

== Technology ==
=== General principles ===
An acoustic camera generally consists of a microphone array and optionally an optical camera. The microphones – analog or digital – are acquired simultaneously or with known relative time delays to be able to use the phase difference between the signals. As the sound propagates in the medium (air, water...) at a finite known speed, a sound source is perceived by the microphones at different time instants and at different sound intensities that depend on both the sound source location and the microphone location.

A popular method to obtain an acoustic image from the measurement of the microphone is to use beamforming: By delaying each microphone signal relatively and adding them, the signal coming from a specific direction $\left(\theta_0, \phi_0\right)$ is amplified while signals coming from other directions are canceled. The power of this resulting signal is then calculated and reported on a power map at a pixel corresponding to the direction $\left(\theta_0, \phi_0\right)$. The process is iterated at each direction where the power needs to be computed.

This method has many advantages – it is robust, easy to understand, highly parallelizable (because each direction can be computed independently), versatile (there exist many types of beamformers), and it is relatively fast. It has some drawbacks: it does not model correctly correlated sound sources, and the produced acoustic map has artifacts, also called side lobes or ghost sources. Methods have been introduced to reduce the artifacts such as DAMAS, or to take in account correlated sources such as CLEAN-SC, both at the price of a higher computational cost.

When the sound sources are near the acoustic camera, the relative intensity perceived by the different microphones and the waves changing from planar to spherical by the acoustic camera, add new information compared to sources being far from the camera. It enables to use more effective methods such as acoustic holography.

==== Reprojection ====
Results of far-field beamforming can be reprojected onto planar or non-planar surfaces.

===== Two-dimensional =====
Some acoustic cameras use two-dimensional acoustic mapping, which uses a unidirectional microphone array (e.g. a rectangle of microphones, all facing the same direction). Two-dimensional acoustic mapping works best when the surface to be examined is planar and the acoustic camera can be set up facing the surface perpendicularly. The surfaces of real-world objects are not often flat, and it is not always possible to optimally position the acoustic camera.

The two-dimensional method of acoustic mapping introduces error into the calculations of the sound intensity at a point. Two-dimensional mapping approximates three-dimensional surfaces into a plane, allowing the distance between each microphone and the focus point to be calculated relatively easily. This approximation ignores the distance differences caused by surfaces having different depths at different points. In most applications of the acoustic camera, this error is small enough to be ignored. In confined spaces, the error becomes significant.

===== Three-dimensional =====
Three-dimensional acoustic cameras fix the errors of two-dimensional cameras by taking into account surface depths, and therefore correctly measuring the distances between the microphone and each spatial point. These cameras produce a more accurate picture, but require a 3-D model of the object or space being analyzed. If the acoustic camera picks up sound from a point in space that is not part of the model, the sound may be mapped to a random space in the model, or the sound may not show up at all.

3-D acoustic cameras can also be used to analyze confined spaces, such as room interiors. In order to do this, a microphone array that is omnidirectional (e.g. a sphere of microphones, each facing a different direction) is required. This is in addition to the first requirement of having a 3-D model.

== Applications ==
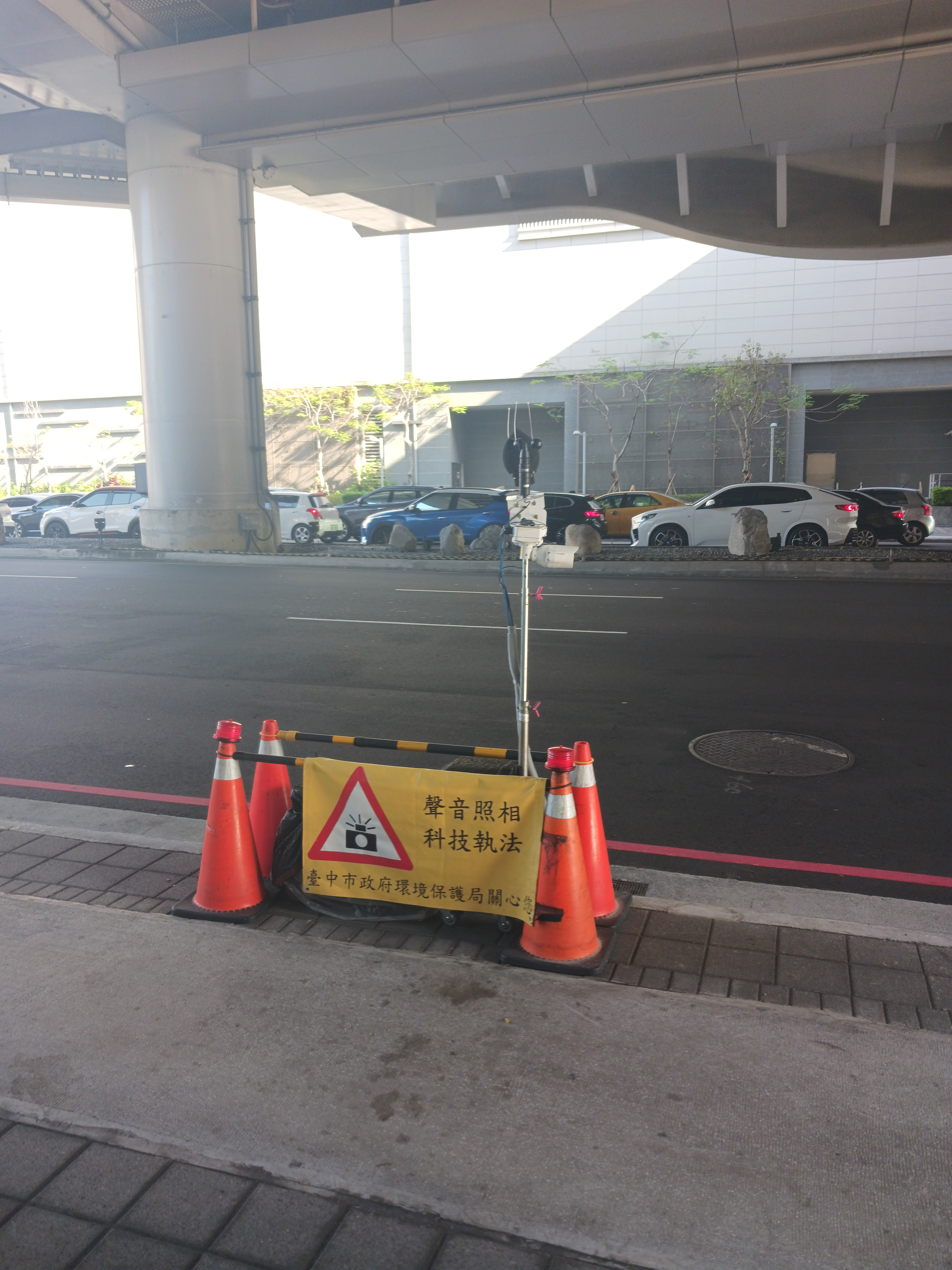
An acoustic camera set in Taichung, Taiwan

There are many applications of the acoustic camera, with most focusing on noise reduction. The camera is frequently applied to improve the noise emission of vehicles (such as cars, airplanes), trains, structures—such as wind turbines and heavy machinery operations such as mining or drilling.

Acoustic cameras are not only used to measure the exterior emission of products but also to improve the comfort inside cabins of cars, train or airplanes. Spherical acoustic cameras are preferred in this type of application because the three-dimensional placement of the microphone allows to localize sound sources in all directions.

Acoustic cameras have been increasingly adopted for leak detection in compressed air systems, gas pipelines, and vacuum installations. By localizing the high-frequency ultrasonic signature emitted from pressurized leaks, these cameras can rapidly identify areas of concern. Entry-level devices can be particularly suitable for routine facility maintenance or in energy efficiency programs where rapid screening is prioritized over detailed analysis.

Troubleshooting of faults that occur in machines and mechanical parts can be accomplished with an acoustic camera. To find where the problem lies, the sound mapping of a properly functional machine can be compared to one of a dysfunctional machine.

A similar setup of the acoustic camera can be used to study the noise inside passenger cars during train operation. Alternatively, the camera can be set up outside, in an area near the train tracks, to observe the train as it goes by. This can give another perspective of the noise that might be heard inside the train. An outside setup can be used to examine the squealing of train wheels caused by a curve in the tracks.

Acoustic camera may be used to aid legal enforcement of noise nuisances caused by people or motor vehicles. Epidemiologist Erica Walker has said this is a "lazy" solution to the problem of noise, and expressed concern acoustic cameras could be used to over-police ethnic minority neighborhoods.

In electrical diagnostics, acoustic imaging can be applied to detect partial discharges (PD) in high-voltage equipment such as switchgear, transformers, and insulators. These discharges often emit broadband acoustic signals before evolving into more serious faults. When equipped with advanced signal processing, acoustic cameras can detect and localize PD events in real-time. For high-stakes environments or predictive maintenance workflows, a more advanced system with enhanced sensitivity and intelligent discharge pattern classification may be better suited for in-depth fault characterization and documentation.

== Challenges ==
=== Dynamic range ===
The effective dynamic range in the imaging plane can be interpreted as the maximum contrast achievable within the target area. An inherent challenge related to the dynamic range of acoustic cameras lies in its dependency on the sound's wavelength and the size of the array. These physical constraints pose difficulties for far-field acoustic cameras aiming to resolve multiple low-frequency sources.

As the aperture size would need to be significantly large to tackle low-frequency issues, it often results in inconclusive or less definitive results within this frequency range. This underlines the unique challenges faced in enhancing the dynamic range of acoustic cameras, particularly in applications involving low-frequency sounds.

=== Low frequencies in the far-field ===
The lowest frequency that can be localized with a far-field acoustic camera is primarily determined by the size of the array's aperture, its largest dimension. Challenges arise when dealing with low-frequency issues, particularly those below 300 Hz, as they require large array sizes for effective sound source localization. Alternatively, there are a number of effective solutions, such as acoustic vector sensors, either standalone or in an array configuration, or near-field acoustic cameras, both can serve as valuable tools for addressing non-stationary issues. Methods that employ direct sound mapping using sound intensity probes and/or particle velocity probes offer robust alternatives for identifying and visualizing time-stationary sound sources.

=== Computational power ===
The signal processing required by the acoustic camera is relatively computationally intensive. Because of this, signal processing is frequently done after the recording of data, which can hinder or prevent the use of the camera in analyzing sounds that only occur occasionally or at varying locations. Cameras that perform signal processing in real time tend to be large and cost tens to hundreds of thousands of USD, but recently now can cost a few thousand USD. Hardware and signal processing improvements have helped to overcome these cost barriers. Signal processing optimizations often focus on reduction of computational complexity, storage requirements, and memory bandwidth (rate of data consumption).
