= Purnima Ratilal =

Acoustical engineer and oceanographer

Purnima Ratilal Makris (born 1971, published as Purnima Ratilal) is an acoustical engineer and oceanographer whose research involves acoustic imaging at the scale of the continental shelf and its applications in tracking marine fish and marine mammal populations. Educated in Singapore and the United States, she works in the United States as a professor in the Department of Electrical and Computer Engineering at Northeastern University.

== Education and career ==
Ratilal received a bachelor's degree in physics from the National University of Singapore in 1994, and worked as a research engineer at DSO National Laboratories in Singapore from 1994 to 1998.

Next, she went to the Massachusetts Institute of Technology (MIT) Department of Ocean Engineering for graduate study in acoustics, with initial support from DSO National Laboratories, and completed her Ph.D. there in 2002. Her dissertation, Remote sensing of submerged objects and geomorphology in continental shelf waters with acoustic waveguide scattering, was supervised by Nicholas C. Makris.

She continued at MIT as a postdoctoral researcher from 2002 to 2004 before taking a faculty position at Northeastern University.

== Recognition ==
Ratilal received the R. Bruce Lindsay Award of the Acoustical Society of America in 2006, "for contributions to the theory of wave propagation and scattering through a waveguide, and to the acoustic remote sensing of marine life". As an assistant professor at Northeastern University, Ratilal received the 2007 Presidential Early Career Award for Scientists and Engineers. She was elected as a Fellow of the Acoustical Society of America in 2014, "for contributions to bioacoustics and underwater acoustic scattering and reverberation".
