= Bruce Jackson (sound engineer) =

Australian audio engineer (1949-2011)

- Jackson in 1985 mixing sound at Wembley Stadium for Bruce Springsteen
- Born: Bruce Robert Jackson; 3 June 1949; Sydney, Australia
- Died: 29 January 2011 (aged 61); Death Valley National Park, California, United States
- Occupations: Audio engineer, entrepreneur
- Website: https://www.brucejackson.com.au/

Bruce Robert Jackson (3 June 1949 – 29 January 2011) was an Australian audio engineer who co-founded JANDS, an Australian audio, lighting and staging company. He joined American touring audio engineer Roy Clair and mixed concert stage monitors for Elvis Presley in the 1970s. With Clair Brothers, a concert sound company, Jackson designed audio electronics including a custom mixing console. Beginning in 1978, Jackson toured as Bruce Springsteen's band engineer for a decade, using Clair Brothers sound systems. A business interest in Fairlight CMI in Sydney introduced Jackson to digital audio, and he subsequently founded the digital audio company Apogee Electronics in Santa Monica, California, where he lived at the time. After selling his share of Apogee, Jackson co-founded with Roy and Gene Clair a joint venture which produced the Clair iO, a loudspeaker management system for control of complex concert sound systems. Jackson turned the venture commercial with the help of Dave McGrath's Lake Technology. Dolby Laboratories bought the technology and formed Dolby Lake with Jackson as vice president, then in 2009 Lab.gruppen acquired the brand. Jackson was honoured with the Parnelli Innovator Award in 2005 for his inventive loudspeaker controller.

While still a partner at Apogee, Jackson began touring with Barbra Streisand, mixing concert sound and serving as sound designer from 1993 to 2007. With two other audio engineers he received an Emmy Award for sound design and sound mixing on Streisand's TV special Barbra: The Concert. Jackson worked on sound design for the 2000 Summer Olympics in Sydney and served as audio director for the opening and closing ceremonies. He performed the same role in Doha, Qatar, at the 2006 Asian Games and in Vancouver, Canada, at the 2010 Winter Olympics.

== JANDS ==
Bruce R. Jackson was the first of five children born to Bruce H. Jackson, Sr and Mavis Jackson, living in Rose Bay. His wealthy parents moved to a mansion in Point Piper, a harbourside suburb of Sydney. (The mansion, "Altona", is one of Australia's most expensive homes.) Jackson first expressed an interest in electronics at age 13 when he set up a basement workbench and small lab under his parents' mansion. While at Vaucluse Boys' High School, Jackson was discovered by investigators of the Postmaster-General's Department, along with a group of his electronics-minded schoolmates, Phillip Storey, Wally Pearce, Bruce Morrison and Adrian Wood operating a pirate radio station "2VH", with a too-powerful AM transmitter—which the boys operated during and after school, and on the weekends, tuned to 1350 kHz in the upper end of the commercial AM band to avoid more powerful commercial radio station signals. The boys did not know that their tube transmitter and very long, very efficient full wavelength antenna were so well crafted that their unlicensed signal was broadcasting all over Sydney and parts of the state of New South Wales 600 km away, at night time.

At age 18, Jackson and one of the boys, Phillip Storey, dropped out of university and became partners in an electronics business. They used their surname initials to form the company name: J&S Research Electronics. The partnership's largest customer, Roger Foley, doing business as Ellis D Fogg, a producer of psychedelic lighting effects, refused to write out the full company name and instead wrote JandS on his checks. The partners added an equipment rental company with the name JANDS Pty Ltd, in response. After moving the company from Point Piper to Rose Bay, JANDS made "whatever the hell they felt like", according to Jackson: lighting equipment, guitar amplifiers and public address system components such as column loudspeakers. He described how, with so many American servicemen stationed in Vietnam spending their recreation time in Sydney, Australian bands and clubs were doing well: "the live music scene was jumping, and we were busy". JANDS' successful rental business paid for the design of new gear. After two years, Jackson and Storey quarrelled and the two decided to disband the company. They sold out to Paul Mulholland, David Mulholland and Eric Robinson, who were operating a small lighting company Jubillee Gaslight, on Sydney's north shore. Later, JANDS grew under Mulholland and Robinson to become Australia's largest sound and lighting company. Jackson and Storey served as consultants to JANDS, from time to time.

== Clair Brothers ==
Jackson first met Roy Clair in 1970 during a world tour by the band Blood, Sweat & Tears when they stopped at Sydney for a concert held at Randwick Racecourse. Clair had brought his unusually large American concert sound system to Australia and Jackson was curious to hear it, and to see how the big black 'W' bins were designed. He and a friend sneaked into the concert and spoke with Clair, asking "a whole stack of questions". Clair decided to leave his sound system in Jackson's hands for a series of Johnny Cash tour dates coming up in some six months, rather than shipping all the gear home to the USA and back in between. Jackson stored the system and then mixed the Cash tour across Australia. Afterward, Clair invited Jackson to visit him in Lititz, Pennsylvania. Following a trip to London, Jackson stopped in at Clair Brothers and stayed to live in Pennsylvania.

Jackson assisted Clair Brothers by teaming with Ron Borthwick to design a mixing console that folded up into its own road case, a proprietary model used by Clair Brothers for some 12 years of top tours. The console used novel plasma bargraph meters which displayed both average and peak sound levels, combining the characteristics of fast peak meters and slower VU meters. Clair Brothers built 10 of the consoles, the first live sound console to incorporate parametric equalisation.

=== Elvis Presley ===
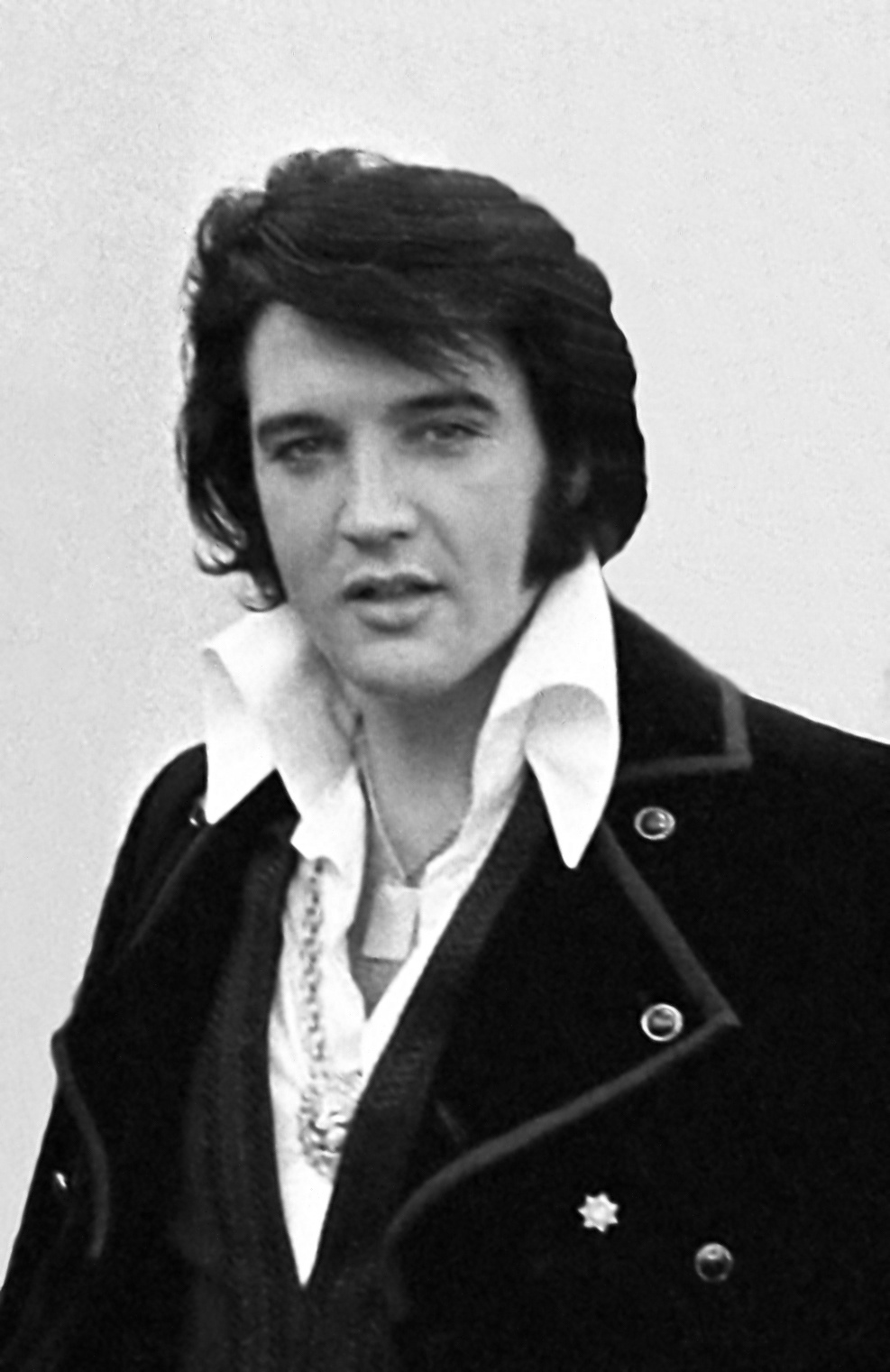
Elvis Presley in 1970

Working for Clair Brothers, Jackson toured with Elvis Presley, mixing monitors while independent engineer Bill Porter mixed front of house (FOH) for the audience. Clair Brothers supplied all the audio gear; Jackson designed a powerful stage monitor system for Presley's show. To make more room for audience seating, he also used a sound reinforcement system that was not mounted on scaffolding but hung with steel chain above the audience from overhead beams, using chain hoists rigged upside down to raise the loudspeakers from the floor—a now-common method used by licensed riggers. Jackson has said that he made a number of concert recordings during this period, all unreleased.

The earliest of these Clair Brothers-supported dates did not have a dedicated monitor engineer—monitors were mixed from FOH by Porter, assisted by Jackson. Jackson noticed that Presley's performance was very much dependent on how easily he was able to hear himself from the monitor speakers. Jackson said, "some nights would work well and others would be a total train wreck." He advocated for a separate monitor mixing position at the side of the stage and after overcoming resistance to the concept was given this dedicated position. Asked whether he thus invented the role of concert monitor engineer, Jackson replied, "no, not really. It was more that its time had just come."

Jackson had to deal with Presley's absence from rehearsals at Graceland and concert soundchecks. The singer would usually show up at the concert venue at the last minute, walk out on stage and start to sing, having never heard the sound system. Presley sometimes turned to the side of the stage to ask Jackson to make changes, and a few times he stopped the show to have Jackson come out and stand center stage and listen carefully to the monitors while Presley sang to 20,000 people. One night in Fort Worth, Texas, Presley led the audience in singing "Happy Birthday to You" in honour of the engineer's birthday—an "amazing, and very embarrassing" occasion for Jackson. Jackson can be seen at his side-stage mix position in Presley's 1977 "CBS Special" TV show. At Presley's final performance on 26 June 1977, he said "I would like to thank my sound engineer: Bruce Jackson from Australia."

Touring with Presley was like no other assignment. Presley and his entourage travelled in four or five jets to the next tour stop: one for Elvis and his closest colleagues, one for the band, one for Colonel Tom Parker (Presley's manager), one for concessions and crew, and a Learjet used by RCA Records management to fly ahead of everyone else. For two weeks during June and July 1973, Elvis flew on an all-black DC-9 airliner with a Playboy logo on the tail; the aircraft was named Big Bunny. Jackson said he and the other Elvis-chosen passengers were served food and drinks by elite Playboy Bunnies called "Jet Bunnies".

Parker managed the concert tours for Presley, and exerted a strong influence. Jackson quit his job while on tour after he was "pushed too far" by Parker, according to Roy Clair. Presley apologised to Jackson, and he rejoined the tour as an independent engineer, answering only to Presley. Jackson mixed hundreds of concerts for the singer, who called him "Bruce the Goose"—a working life filled with strange hours, hard physical labour and constant travelling. In August 1977 he was in Portland, Maine setting up at the next Presley engagement when he heard he had died.

== Independent engineer ==
=== Bruce Springsteen ===
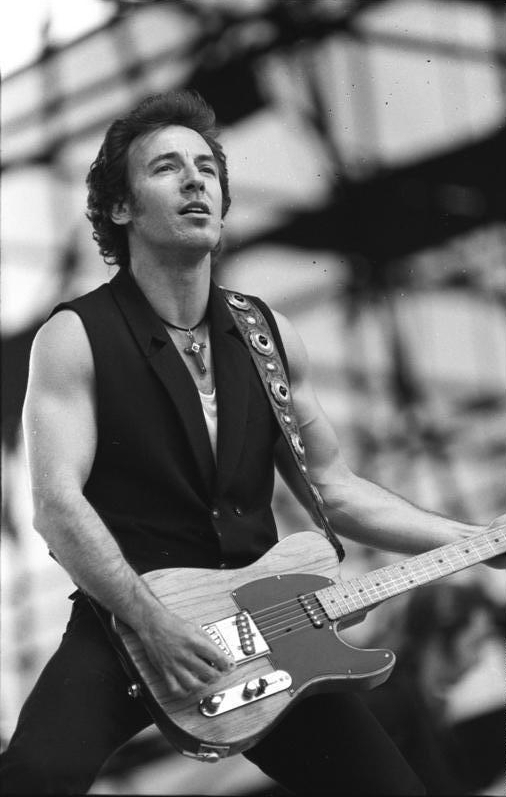
Bruce Springsteen in 1988 on the Tunnel of Love Express Tour

As an independent engineer, Jackson signed a contract to work directly for Bruce Springsteen, on concert tours supported by Clair Brothers. Jackson mixed Springsteen on four major tours from 1978 to 1988, and is credited as engineer on the album Live/1975–85. The tours include Darkness, The River, Born in the U.S.A. and Tunnel of Love Express. Prior to each tour, Springsteen and the E Street Band practised at Clair Brothers in Lititz to check out new sound system components and lighting effects, and to give crew members a chance to work out the technical details. Jackson mixed the rehearsals and concerts on the folding console he designed for Clair Brothers. Springsteen called him "BJ".

Right away, Jackson noticed that Springsteen was a very particular critic of his own concert sound. At every new venue, Springsteen would take "BJ" around to various seats in the concert venue, sitting in every section, even the last row of seats, and listen to the band play. He asked Jackson why the sound was not so good far away as it was up close, and if the audio crew could do anything about it. Jackson said, "we can do a lot about it", and worked with Clair Brothers to design a ring of delay loudspeakers positioned closer to the farthest seats to augment the high frequencies lost over distance by sound waves travelling through air. This made the hi-hat sound more "crisp and clean", with higher quality sound in the back row than previously experienced in such large venues. Throughout Jackson's years with him, Springsteen maintained his interest in delivering high quality sound to every seat, and the solutions grew in size and complexity until by 1984 there were eight delay towers set up for the largest venues.

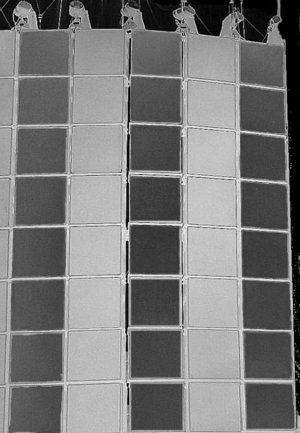
A representation of alternating vertical columns of left and right stereo channels in a large concert loudspeaker cluster (Clair Brothers' S4)

In 1981 for The River Tour, Jackson arrived at a vertical configuration of loudspeakers which were supplied with nominal left and right stereo signals, the signals connected throughout the sound system in an alternating pattern of vertical lines of eight loudspeakers each, giving the audience a semblance of stereo imaging otherwise impractical on such a large scale. He continued to use this method on the Born in the U.S.A. Tour in 1985. A reporter from Popular Mechanics described the 160 main and 40 auxiliary loudspeakers typically used at a large arena or stadium. Jackson set the main loudspeakers 54 feet (16 m) high on scaffolding, each enclosure holding two 18-inch low-frequency cone drivers, four 10-inch mid-frequency cone drivers, two high-mid compression drivers and two high-frequency compression drivers. The auxiliary zones covered audience areas which wrapped around to the sides of the stage. The 200 loudspeakers were driven by 96 amplifier channels capable of putting out a total of 380,000 watts. The tour was said to have drawn "unusual critical acclaim for crispness and distortion-free performances." Jackson was nominated for a TEC Award as 1985's best sound reinforcement engineer but Gene Clair received the honour.

Jackson worked closely with individual musicians in Springsteen's band to help them achieve the sound they wanted. Keyboard player Danny Federici received attention from John Stilwell and Jackson who collaborated in modifying his cut-down Hammond B-3 organ. Clarence Clemons came to Jackson with his ideas about microphones; subsequently, the sound of his saxophones was picked up by a device invented jointly by Clemons and Jackson. Bassist Garry Tallent described the elements of his bass rig to a reporter then summed up its overall effect by saying, "the rest is up to God and Bruce Jackson."

Jackson was close to Presley, but the two men were not near in age. Springsteen was closer to Jackson's age and the two got along as friends, the singer giving a Jeep off-road vehicle as a gift in thanks for his contribution to successful concerts. Jackson said of the Jeep that he sold it after tiring of "bouncing around the place in it." In 1988, Jackson quit touring at the birth of his son Lindsey. He settled in Santa Monica, California, to concentrate on audio electronics ideas. However, he was consulted occasionally by Springsteen staff and Clair Bros to solve acoustic issues during subsequent tours, for instance in Verona, Italy in 1993.

=== Barbra Streisand ===
Jackson was working as an entrepreneur in digital audio electronics in 1993 when Barbra Streisand's producer asked him to mix her first concert tour in decades. Jackson signed on partly because he was assured he could do anything to make her concert sound as good as possible. Jackson determined that huge concert venues such as Wembley Stadium and Madison Square Garden would be carpeted for Streisand, and that expensive heavy drapes would be hung at the walls to damp sound reflections. After discovering that Streisand did not like to listen to any stage monitors made after the 1960s, he designed a stage wedge which used soft dome drivers for midrange and for high frequencies rather than the more powerful compression drivers in common use after the 1970s. As well, the main sound system Jackson specified was a new design by Clair Brothers, a proprietary line array system called the I4. Streisand was not willing to wear in-ear monitors but the band was fitted with them, to reduce stage wash and make the band's instruments stand out better individually in the mix. The stage monitors, line array and extravagant acoustic treatments were a hit with Streisand, who said of Jackson that he was "the best sound engineer in the world."

Streisand employed Jackson's mixing talents on her 1995 TV special called Barbra: The Concert. Along with Ed Greene and Bob La Masney who worked on post-production mixing, he received an Emmy Award for sound design and the mixing of the live show. Jackson designed the sound for Streisand's 1999–2000 Timeless: Live in Concert Tour, and he mixed the New Year's Eve concert 31 December 1999 at the MGM Grand Garden Arena in Paradise, Nevada. He mixed Streisand's appearances in Sydney and Melbourne in March 2000, connecting the large backing choir's sound mix by optical fibre from a nearby polo field where the choir was stationed. The fibre connection was Jackson's real-world test of a similar setup planned to be used for the Summer Olympics six months later.

Jackson mixed Streisand's U.S. and world tours in 2006 and 2007, using a Digidesign Venue digital mixing console at FOH for its smaller footprint (allowing more audience seats) and its plug-in audio effects. As well, the Venue mixing system was chosen for its integration with Pro Tools hardware and software, to make 128-channel hard disk recordings of the concerts directly from the three Digidesign consoles: one to mix strings, one to mix brass, reeds and percussion, and one under Jackson's control out in the audience, with Streisand's microphone inputs and stems (submixes of other microphones) from the other consoles. The recordings made in New York City and Washington, D.C. were remixed into the album Live in Concert 2006—Jackson was listed as sound designer. Sharing sound designer and FOH mixing duties with Chris Carlton, Jackson made certain that the custom soft dome monitor wedges were positioned correctly aiming up from under the stage to cover everywhere Streisand might walk. Clair Brothers supplied 18 Dolby Lake Processors for the tour, the majority used by Jackson to tune the main sound system, and the rest for control of monitor wedges used by Streisand and by the supporting artist, Il Divo. For Streisand's voice, Jackson auditioned several wireless microphones and ended up using a Sennheiser SKM 5200 transmitter equipped with a Neumann KK 105 S supercardioid capsule. He used the vocal microphone to test the sound system from different locations around the arena. When the tour hit the UK and continental Europe, Jackson changed from a Neumann to a Røde Microphones capsule, custom made to his requirements; one that Røde called the "Jackson Special". Jackson used Millennia Media microphone pre-amps for any microphone that was required to be sent to multiple mixing consoles, such as at Madison Square Garden where cable runs to the recording trucks were 800 feet (240 m) long. The use of only one pre-amp prevents the microphone output from being loaded down by too little resistance which can change its tone quality.

=== Other artists ===
In addition to Presley, Springsteen and Streisand, Jackson mixed concert sound for Diana Ross, Stevie Wonder, Rod Stewart and the Faces, Barry White, Jefferson Airplane, Ozzy Osbourne, Carly Simon, Three Dog Night, the Jackson 5, Cat Stevens, Glen Campbell, Art Garfunkel, Procol Harum and Lou Reed. During 1983 when Springsteen was not touring, Jackson mixed sound for Stevie Nicks on The Wild Heart Tour, June to November 1983. Fourteen years later he mixed for Fleetwood Mac during their live performances recorded in Burbank for MTV, released as the album The Dance.

== World events ==
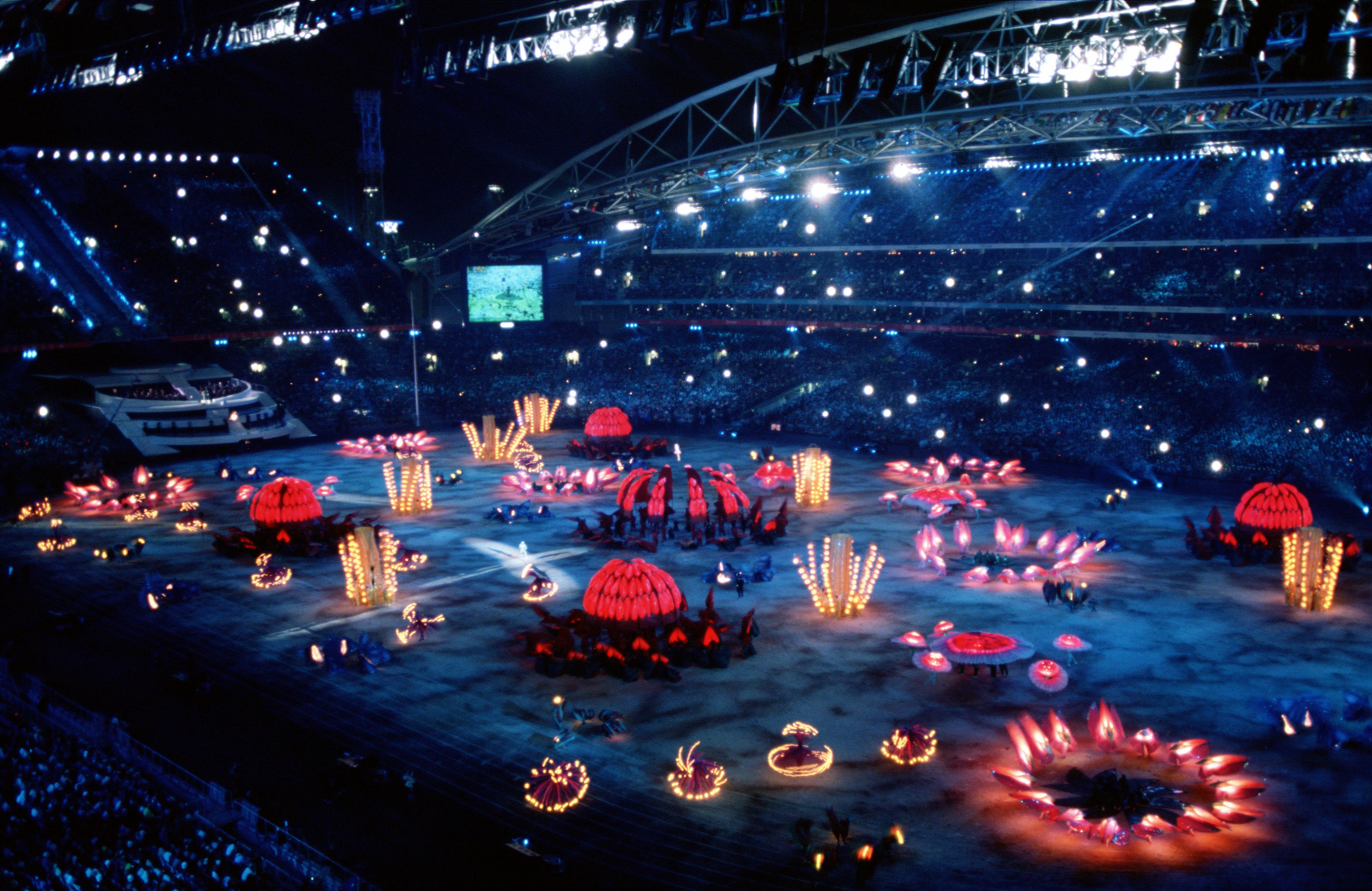
2000 Summer Olympics opening ceremony

In 1998, Jackson was contacted by Ric Birch of the Sydney Organising Committee for the Olympic Games (SOCOG) to mix sound for the 2000 Summer Olympic Games in Sydney. Jackson felt that his skills would be put to best use as organiser and audio director rather than as one man behind a mixing console. He put together a team of audio professionals as well as an equipment design composed of digital nodes linked with optic fibre to transport digital audio around the largest venues without attenuation or ground hum. To wire the spectacle which played to 110,000 people in attendance and some 3 billion distant viewers around the world, redundant systems were connected throughout so that a single failure point could not halt the show. To complete the assignment, Jackson said one of the main factors was working within budget, which was not unlimited as it had been with Streisand. He served as audio director for the opening ceremony on 15 September and the closing ceremony on 1 October. Before the event, he told a reporter, "I have a well rehearsed crew in place and there is every reason to expect it to go well."

In December 2006, Jackson served as audio director at the 15th Asian Games, held in Doha, Qatar. The main loudspeakers for the opening and closing ceremonies were the KUDO model from L-Acoustics. Jackson found that extreme heat and occasional downpours did not adversely affect the Optocore fibre audio connections around the largest venues. Digital audio was passed to a combination of Lake Contour and Dolby Lake Processors.

Following his success in Sydney, Jackson was tapped to direct the audio design and production at the 2010 Winter Olympics in Vancouver, British Columbia, Canada, where he directed the opening ceremony and the closing ceremony. His sound design for BC Place Stadium did not have loudspeakers at ground level aimed up at the seating areas—Jackson determined that this approach would produce too much uncontrolled reverberation from sound waves bouncing off the ceiling. Instead, he configured two rings of loudspeakers hung from the ceiling 100 ft (30 m) above the ground, aimed downward. The inner ring held 8 arrays each composed of 12 Clair Brothers i3 line array speakers and the outer ring held 12 arrays of 7 Clair Brothers i3 line array speakers, augmented by 16 subwoofers. The lot was powered by 160 Lab.gruppen amplifiers which were also hung from the ceiling, and were networked via Dante in a triple-redundant configuration. Two DiGiCo D5 digital mixing consoles served as main and backup for the main audience sound, and two Yamaha PM1Ds handled main and backup duties for monitor mixing. Other equipment included dual-redundant Optocore fibre connections, two Dolby Lake Processors, and time code generated by two pairs of Fairlights which also handled audio cues timed to the action on the field.

Jackson directed sound for the 2010 Shanghai Expo opening ceremony, held on 30 April 2010. He used four Fairlight digital audio systems to replay music cues, connected to Studer routing and distribution gear which supplied signal to Soundcraft digital mixers and an analogue mixer. Some 64 kilometres (40 mi) of fibre optic cable in a dual-redundant star topology connected 72 amplifier racks along both sides of the Huangpu River. Each amp rack held a BSS Audio loudspeaker controller and multiple Crown International amplifiers, pushing audio signal to more than 400 JBL loudspeakers.

== Digital audio ==
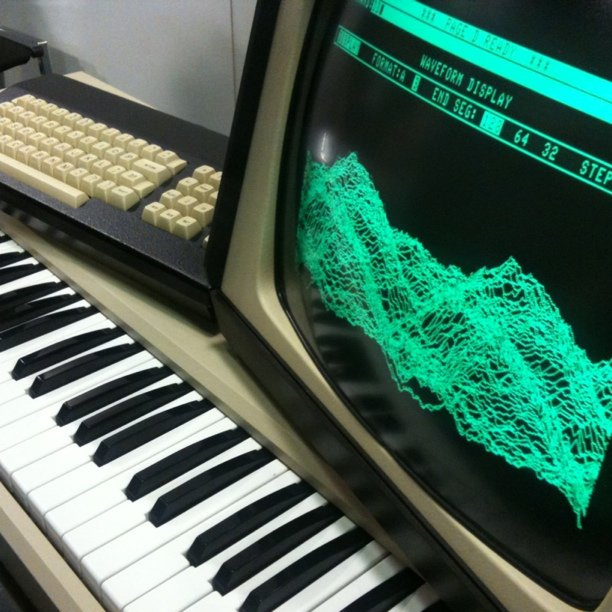
Fairlight CMI, an early sampler

Beginning in 1979 between Springsteen tour dates, Jackson crisscrossed the U.S. promoting the Fairlight CMI, a digital sampler made by fellow Australians Peter Vogel and Kim Ryrie. (Ryrie grew up in Point Piper next to Jackson's house.) The earliest Fairlights were prohibitively expensive, and their 24 kHz sampling rate was not considered high enough for audio mastering, but Jackson found that musicians immediately discovered how useful the Fairlight was for composition. Rick Wakeman explored the sampler, as did Tony Bongiovi, founder of the Power Station recording studio in New York City. There, Springsteen was shown the sampler and said, "Ah yeah, BJ that's great, but what am I gonna do with it?"

None of Jackson's prospects bought one in the first year. He had better luck with Herbie Hancock, Stevie Wonder, and Geordie Hormel who bought two for $27,500 each. Wonder, who had recently recorded Stevie Wonder's Journey Through "The Secret Life of Plants" using a Computer Music Melodian sampler, paid for his Fairlight by signing a personal check with his thumbprint. He then convinced Jackson to mix sound for a tour he was undertaking in support of Secret Life of Plants. Jackson's close association with Fairlight made him intimately aware of the limitations of early digital audio, "weaknesses" such as noise and inharmonic distortion.

During an April 1985 Springsteen tour leg in Japan, Jackson first listened to Compact Discs played on a CD player connected to his concert sound system, and he did not like what he heard.

=== Apogee Electronics ===
After finishing Springsteen's Born in the U.S.A. tour, Jackson expressed his ideas about possible improvements to digital audio in a conversation with Christof Heidelberger, a designer of digital audio electronics, and Betty Bennett, the president of Soundcraft's U.S. division. Jackson, Bennett and Heidelberger formed Apogee Electronics in December 1985 (announced in the 23 November issue of Billboard) and started investigating 44 kHz digital audio circuits for audible problems. They found that "textbook filters" which were unnecessarily steep were protecting the CD player output from high levels of 20 kHz signals, an exceedingly unlikely occurrence in music. Jackson determined that Apogee could improve the sound of CDs if the low-pass filters used in the recording process were made less steep, for less phase shift throughout the hearing range. The small company produced better anti-aliasing filters for recording equipment. Initially operating out of his garage, Jackson served as the company's owner and president, and his third wife Bennett headed up sales. They demonstrated their first product at the Audio Engineering Society's 81st convention held in Los Angeles in November 1986: the 944 Series low-dispersion, linear phase, active low-pass filter, intended to replace existing filters on multi-track digital tape recorders such as the Sony PCM-3324. After a slow start, the firm sold 30,000 of the filters: "a great success." The 944 earned a TEC Award in 1988, the first of many such awards for Apogee.

Apogee Electronics logo

Apogee's branding was largely Jackson's doing. Bennett said in 2005 that the company's decision to sell purple-coloured products was one of Jackson's ideas: "He has a good eye for design, and we wanted to distinguish ourselves from the all-black rack gear that everybody had at that point." Jackson encouraged a lighting designer from Clair Brothers to sketch a company logo on a cocktail napkin over dinner one evening, and that was immediately made the Apogee logo.

In 1994, Jackson spoke to a Billboard reporter about digital audio. Described as Apogee's president and chief engineer, he said, "digital is finally living up to the warm, natural sound of analogue that we know and love." A decade later, he warned against the belief that bigger specification numbers guarantee better sound quality. He noted that 192 kHz sampling rate was often cited as being better than 96 kHz because of it being twice as fast "when in reality there's a whole bunch of other influencing factors responsible for any audible improvements."

Jackson and Bennett divorced in the mid-1990s and he sold his share of Apogee to finance the divorce settlement. Company co-founder Bennett became CEO.

=== Loudspeaker management system ===
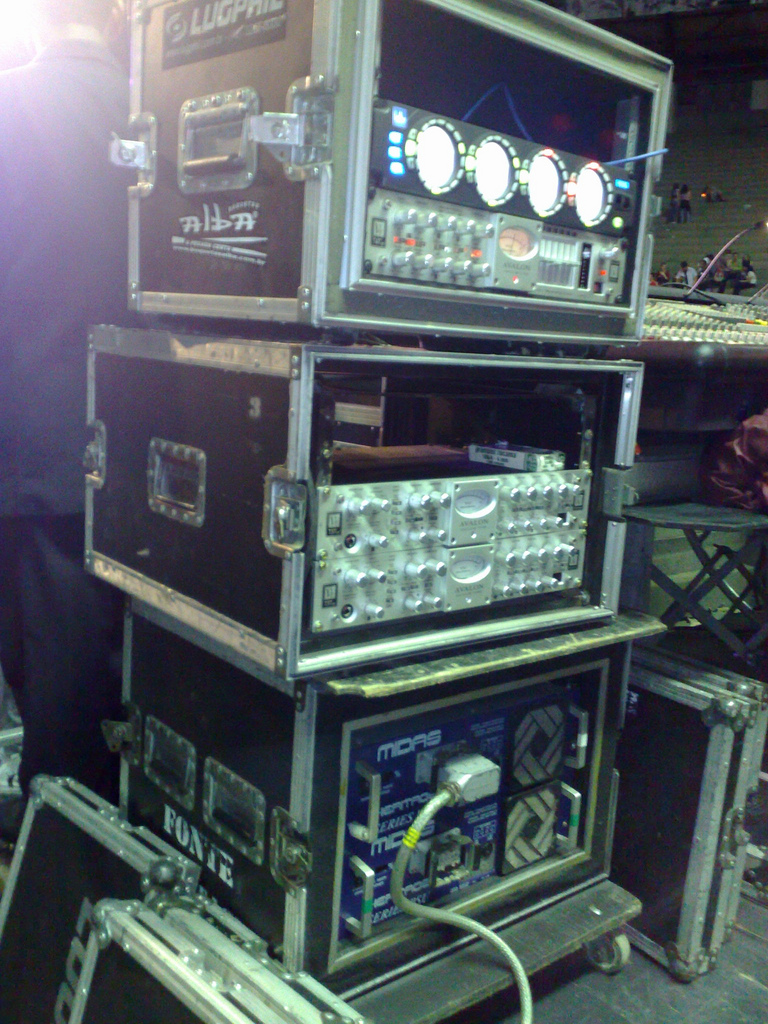
At a Hillsong United show at the Gigantinho sports arena in Brazil, a Dolby Lake Processor shows its four circular control displays at the top of other racked gear.

After leaving Apogee, Jackson entered into a joint venture with Clair Brothers to design a digital loudspeaker controller for control of complex concert sound systems. Jackson estimated that the project would cost $800,000 in U.S. dollars, but it ended up costing Clair Brothers more than $2M. From the same garage in which he started Apogee, Jackson developed the proprietary Clair iO: a two-input, six-output digital audio matrix with opto-isolated output circuits. An essential element of the system was its ability to be controlled by wireless tablet computer by an audio engineer walking around to various seating sections in a concert venue, to tailor the system's response more precisely.

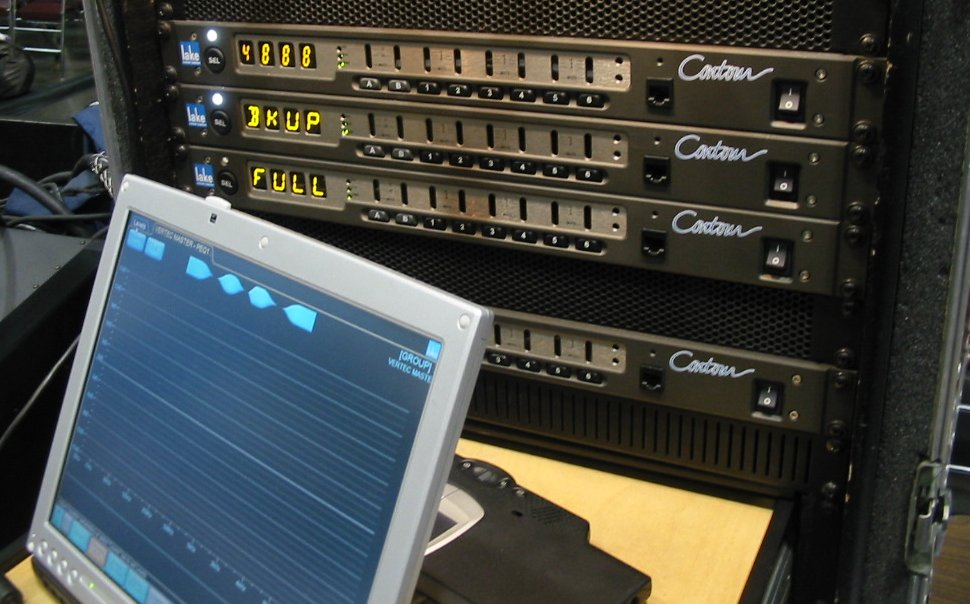
Lake Contour DSPs in a rack, with a wireless touchscreen interface

Jackson then joined with Dave McGrath of Lake Technology to produce a commercial version of the controller, the Lake Contour, essentially the same hardware but with different software. McGrath and Jackson acquired Clair Technologies LLC, the earlier joint venture. In turn, Dolby Laboratories bought Lake in 2004, Jackson staying with the product line to become vice president of the live sound division at Dolby, and by 2005 the loudspeaker controller was being used by seven of the ten top concert tours; 3,000 units had been built. Jackson moved back to Sydney in 2005 with Terri—his fourth wife—and their children, but in November he returned to the U.S. to accept his Parnelli Innovator Award. In 2006, the digital audio product was redesigned and introduced as the Dolby Lake Processor, capable of 4-in, 12-out operation as a loudspeaker crossover; 8-in, 8-out operation as a system equaliser; or a combination of 2 crossovers and 4 equalizers—the whole integrated with Smaart audio analysis software. A collaboration between Dolby and Swedish audio electronics company Lab.gruppen was announced in 2007; Jackson's technology would be incorporated into Lab.gruppen's Powered Loudspeaker Management (PLM) system. Two years later, Lab.gruppen acquired the Lake brand for further development of the PLM and other product lines. John Carey of Dolby said, "As we pass the live sound torch to Lab.gruppen we are confident that they will continue to innovate and evolve the technology."

== Pilot ==
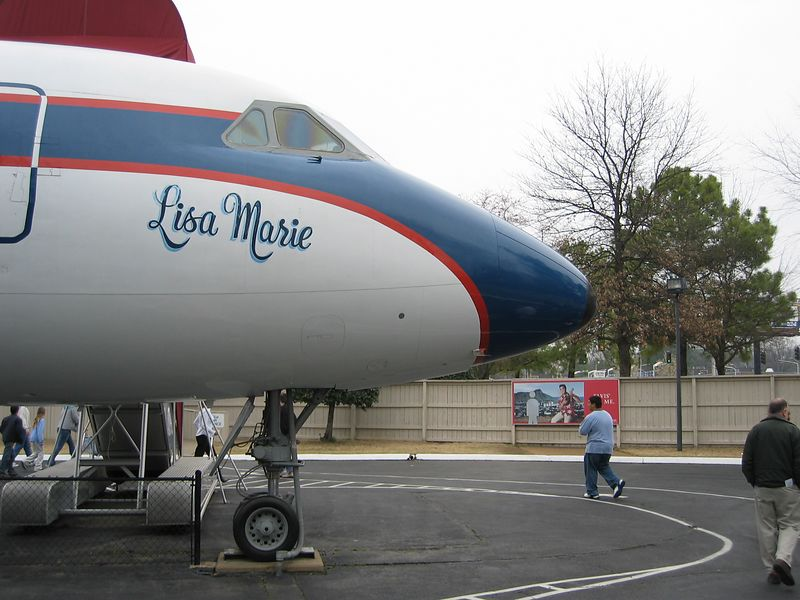
Elvis Presley's jet airliner

Jackson was an avid pilot, licensed to fly from early adulthood. He flew often, for pleasure, one of the few concert audio engineers who did. In the 1970s between Presley concert dates, Jackson flew the singer's personal jet airliner, a converted Convair 880 named Lisa Marie after Presley's daughter. For Presley's band rehearsals at Graceland, Jackson would fly some 800 miles (1,300 km) from Lititz to Memphis with the back of a small plane loaded with assorted mic stands, cables and monitor loudspeakers. The band would rehearse for a bit in Graceland's racquetball court, then hang out in the Jungle Room waiting for Presley who rarely came downstairs.

A small aircraft owner, at one time Jackson operated a 1975 Grumman American AA-5B Tiger. In 1979 he sold it to his lighting company friend, Tait Towers founder Michael Tait, to pay for an earlier purchase of a more powerful aircraft, a new Mooney M20J that he registered 7 December 1978. Jackson used the M20J to carry Fairlight samplers across the U.S. to demonstrate them to studios and musicians, once flying from New York to Los Angeles in 15 hours after he heard Herbie Hancock was interested. Interviewed in 2005 at his Sydney office, Jackson said he missed his "little plane" terribly, that it was kept in a hangar for his use whenever he visited California, surrounded by dusty boxes of audio gear and stored memorabilia. He said he had considered flying it from California to Australia but his wife was "not too keen on the idea."

Jackson was interested in aviation developments. In mid-2010 he flew himself and a friend to Mojave Air and Space Port to see Virgin Galactic's VSS Enterprise, a sub-orbital spacecraft being glide-tested.

=== Death ===
Jackson landed his Mooney at Furnace Creek Airport (the lowest elevation airstrip in North America) near the visitor center of Death Valley National Park early in the afternoon of 29 January 2011. He had no flight plan filed. Following a brief stop he took off in clear, sunny weather bound for Santa Monica, but a few minutes later he crashed and died about 6.5 miles (11 km) south of the airfield in a dry lake bed. The wreckage was discovered by park rangers on the morning of 31 January, and was later examined by investigators who did not determine a cause for the accident. Jackson was survived by two brothers and two sisters, and by his fourth wife, Terri, their daughter Brianna, and Aja, Jackson's stepdaughter. He was survived by his third wife Betty Bennett and their son Lindsey and daughter Alex. Jackson was survived by his second wife Ruth Davis who sang background vocals for Springsteen. He was also survived by his first wife Margaret who married him when they were both 21 years old. Margaret was with him when he started JANDS, and accompanied him to the U.S. when he went to work for Clair Brothers.

A memorial celebration of Jackson's life was held 25 February at the Sydney Opera House. Some 500 attendees listened to remembrances and anecdotes from family members and from business colleagues such as Roy Clair and David McGrath. Prerecorded videos were played, sent from Springsteen, the band U2, Streisand and her manager Martin Erlichman, and members of Fleetwood Mac.

In 2018, a book was published of Jackson's life, especially about his time with Elvis Presley. The book, Bruce Jackson: On The Road With Elvis, was written by Jackson's brother Gary, who assembled extensive diary entries and interview clips, and double-checked the facts with industry colleagues. Springsteen wrote the foreword.
