= Lily M. Wang =

American architectural and acoustical engineer

Lily M. Wang is an American architectural engineer and acoustical engineer whose research concerns the acoustical performance of buildings and the effects of building noise on human health and comfort, task performance, education, and music perception. She is the director of the Durham School of Architectural Engineering and Construction and Charles W. and Margre H. Durham Distinguished Professor at the University of Nebraska–Lincoln.

== Education and career ==
Following childhood interests in music and the design of concert halls, Wang majored in civil engineering as an undergraduate at Princeton University, with an undergraduate thesis on the acoustic properties of tension fabric buildings. After failing to find work as an acoustical consultant, she entered a master's program in acoustics at Pennsylvania State University, where she was convinced by Victor Sparrow, a professor there, to continue her studies at the doctoral level. She completed a Ph.D. applying acoustic holography to study sound propagation from violins, supervised by Courtney Burroughs.

She was deflected from acoustical consulting once again, this time by an Acoustical Society of America postgraduate fellowship to work with Anders Christian Gade at the Technical University of Denmark. Following this, in 2000, she took a faculty position at the University of Nebraska, where she has remained. She became associate dean in the College of Engineering in 2018, and director of the Durham School of Architectural Engineering and Construction in 2021.

She was president of the Acoustical Society of America for a term from 2018 to 2019.

== Recognition ==
Wang was the 2005 recipient of the R. Bruce Lindsay Award of the Acoustical Society of America, given "for contributions to room and musical acoustics". She was elected as a Fellow of the Acoustical Society of America in 2007, "for contributions to architectural acoustics and noise control".

== Personal life ==
Wang is married to David Yuill, also a professor of architectural engineering at the University of Nebraska; they have two daughters.
