= Vaucluse High School =

Location
- Old South Head Road, Vaucluse, Sydney, New South Wales; Australia; 33°51′31″S 151°16′49″E

Information
- Former name: Vaucluse Boys' High School (1960–1981)
- Type: Public co-educational secondary day school
- Motto: Latin: Lumen Scientiae (The light of knowledge)
- Established: 1960
- Status: Closed
- Closed: 2006
- Educational authority: NSW Department of Education
- Colours: Gold and blue
- Yearbook: Lumen

Vaucluse High School (VHS), formerly known from 1960 to 1981 as Vaucluse Boys' High School (VBHS), is a former public co-educational secondary day school that was, until its closure, located in Vaucluse, an eastern suburb of Sydney, New South Wales, Australia. In 2006 the school was merged with Dover Heights Girls High School to form the Rose Bay Secondary College.

== History ==
In 1877, the Government of New South Wales acquired the 4-hectare (11-acre) site of Shaftesbury and established the Shaftesbury Reformatory for Girls in 1880. Several other institutions including the Shaftesbury Institute for Destitute Inebriates and the Shaftesbury Home for Mothers and Babies took the reformatory's place over the following decades, until the buildings were demolished in 1930 and the land sold; with the Government retaining a portion for later use.

Vaucluse Boys' High School was officially opened on 30 June 1960 by the Governor of New South Wales, Lieutenant-General Sir Eric Woodward at a ceremony attended by the Member for Vaucluse, Geoffrey Cox, the Director-General of Education, Harold Wyndham, and the NSW Minister for Education, Ernest Wetherell. The first principal was H. Keith Harris, who led the school from its founding to his retirement in 1971. The last principal of Vaucluse High was David Tomlin who remained at the school until its closure in 2006, and thereafter took up the position of principal at Manly Selective Campus.

The school won the Hume Barbour Trophy for debating in 1964, 1965 and 1968.

The school became co-educational in January 1982. It was declared in 2005 that Vaucluse High and the nearby Dover Heights High would be merged to form Rose Bay Secondary College. It was also decided that the Vaucluse High site would be closed and the college would be based on the Dover Heights site instead. The land on which Vaucluse High School stands was sold for an undisclosed amount of money. A Development Application was filed with Woollahra Council to convert the site into a retirement/nursing home operated by the Mark Moran Group.

In 2010, a fire was deliberately lit in the Hall which was subsequently torn down, along with the canteen, change rooms and the woodworking classrooms.

== Notable alumni ==
- Kerry Casey – Australian actor
- Brook Emery – Australian poet, educator, and surf lifesaver
- Steve Finnane – Australian rugby union player
- Bruce Jackson – audio engineer
- Mark McInnes – former CEO of David Jones
- Austen Tayshus (born Alexander Jacob Gutman) – Australian comedian
- Henry Tsang OAM – architect, politician and former member of the New South Wales Legislative Council (1999–2009) and Deputy Lord Mayor of Sydney (1991–1999)
- Peter Weir AM – Australian film director
- Mia Freedman-journalist

== Notable staff ==
- Douglas Daft

== See also ==
- List of government schools in Sydney
- Education in Australia
- Dover Heights Boys High School
