= Per Vilhelm Brüel =

Danish physicist (1915–2015)

- Born: 6 March 1915; Copenhagen, Denmark
- Died: 2 April 2015 (aged 100)
- Education: Technical University of Denmark
- Occupations: Physicist, Engineer
- Family: von Brühl

Per Vilhelm Brüel (6 March 1915 – 2 April 2015) was a Danish physicist and engineer who pioneered and made fundamental contributions to the development of the physics of sound and vibration. He also formed and founded the world's largest manufacturer and supplier of sound and vibration measurement equipment, systems and solutions, Brüel & Kjær. Brüel was a close friend of Niels Bohr, and despite danger Brüel travelled from Sweden to Denmark during the German occupation with important documents of Bohr's work. Brüel was fluent in Danish, German, English, Swedish, and spoke French and Italian.

Brüel was a descendant of the Brüel branch of the German noble family, the von Brühl family.

== Early years ==
Brüel was born in Copenhagen as the eldest son to his family. Brüel's father was a forester, a tradition that he intended his son to continue. However, Brüel did not like the idea of becoming a forester, causing a family scandal.

The family lived in the South of Jutland, away from schools and towns. When Brüel got older, he was sent away for "blacksmith" education, which then denoted a practical education in engineering. But he decided to attend university and reallocated to the technical university in Copenhagen. There Brüel pursued aerodynamics, electronics, and acoustics.

== Early career ==
At the Technical University of Denmark, Brüel started working on his Ph.D., which today would be equivalent to Master of Science, in 1932, and finished it in about five months. Brüel's mentor was P.O. Pedersen, a famous Danish engineer and physicist, and Brüel was handpicked by Pedersen to work with him. Brüel later described Pedersen as brilliant, but that he took credit for Brüel's and his other students' work.

In January 1939, Brüel was drafted into the Danish army to do the radio for the military for a year, and it was there he built his first instrument, a battery-operated, constant-percentage bandwidth analyzer.

In the end of 1942, due to German occupation of Denmark, Brüel went to work in Sweden. He there went on to do important work in both Sweden and Finland, including constructing an acoustic lab at Chalmers University.

== BRÜEL & KJÆR and the Second World War ==
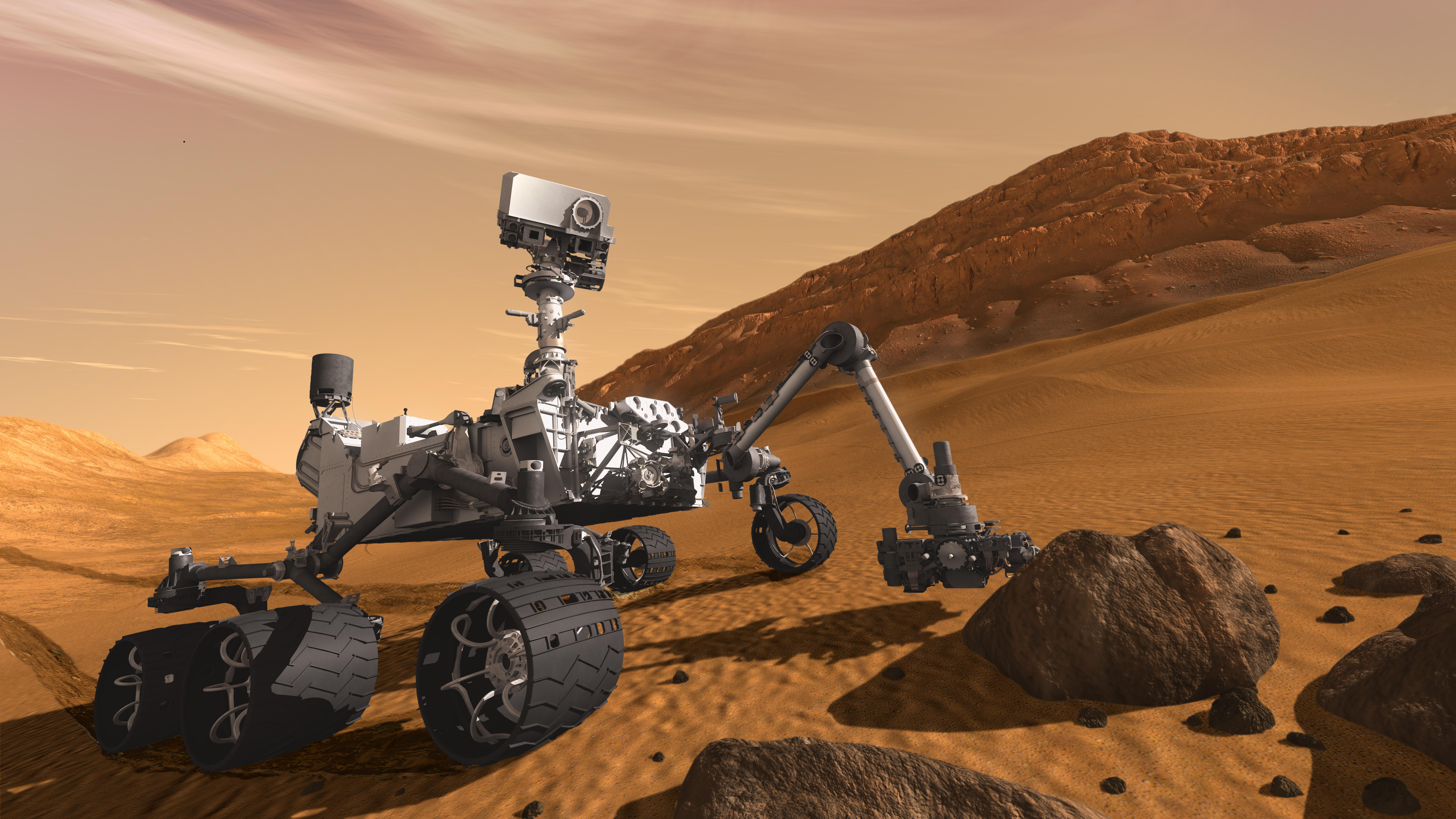
NASA's Mars rover 'Curiosity' was tested using a Brüel and Kjær LDS shaker system

In 1942, Brüel started the company Brüel & Kjær with his old friend Viggo Kjær. The company experienced immediate growth, and they quickly expanded their sales throughout Scandinavia. However, due to WW2, they soon had shortage of copper. Luckily, Brüel had a good friend who was trying to cause problems for the Germans, and informed Brüel about Germans' thick communication cable from Copenhagen to Berlin that was in the sea, and together they picked it up, destroying Hitler's communication with his troops for some time. In 1945, Holger Nielsen became a partner in the firm, for which he worked until his death in 1978.

Despite the ongoing world war, Brüel managed to navigate his company and career to further success. In 1948, Brüel & Kjær bought their first property, a wooden army barracks in Nærum, 15 km north of Copenhagen, which are the premises where the company's headquarter is still located today. Brüel was responsible for product planning and research. As long as the market was limited to Denmark and Sweden, Brüel initially delivered instruments to customers on his Nimbus motorcycle. He still has this original antique in the basement of his home.

When the rest of Scandinavia and some parts of Europe joined the market, cars were needed. By the 1980s, there were about 30 company cars. In 1956, with customers in the rest of Europe and in some other parts of the world, "Brüel & Kjær Airlines" was established. The company eventually maintained a substantial fleet of aircraft, including two Piper Aztecs and two Beechcraft King Airs. This made it possible for Brüel and other company pilots to make airborne deliveries directly to any customer that was located near a general aviation airport. The fleet also provided high-speed transportation, independent of the scheduled airlines, to employees and customers. When Brüel was flying as PIC (pilot in command), he would often appoint a nontrained employee to be a co-pilot on some of his trips. Brüel often blamed (in jest) these hapless individuals for doing a lousy piloting job. In the mid 80s, a number of employees were asked to get a pilot license to fly with Brüel due to concern with his advancing age. He subsequently solved this issue by hiring his flight instructor as his personal co-pilot. To the consternation of passengers, he was even older than Brüel

Kjær used a bicycle as primary transportation between home and work, while Brüel used a company aircraft for commuting to and from his summer house on Anholt Island. In regard to automobiles, Nielsen used a Jaguar while Brüel had a Fiat 500. When asked why he preferred the Fiat to the other more comfortable company cars, Brüel answered that the comfort in a Fiat 500 was so poor that he could keep the car for himself; nobody in the company would ever ask him for a lift.

In 1953, Brüel & Kjær was part of the first European corporation delegation into China. Brüel died at the age of 100 on 2 April 2015.

== Friendship with Niels Bohr ==
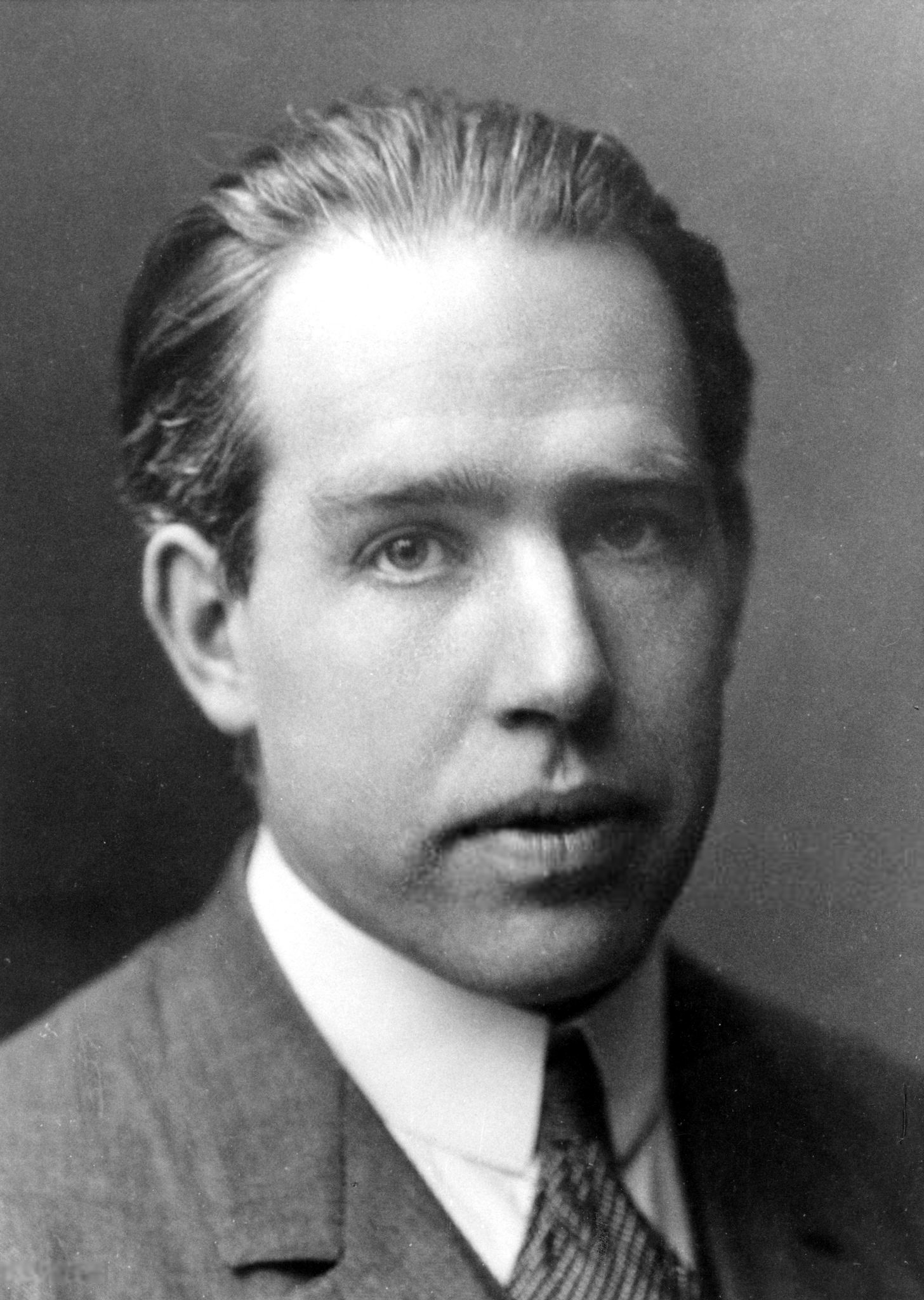
Niels Bohr

Brüel was a close friend of Niels Bohr and frequently attended dinners at Bohr's house, where they would dine and discuss physics.

When Brüel and Bohr both lived in Sweden during WW2, Brüel neglected apparent danger and flew to Denmark from time to time, carrying his friend Bohr's documents of his important work on quantum physics.

== Legacy ==
Brüel was instrumental in the construction of the level recorder, which would become one of the most successful products for his company Brüel & Kjær. Brüel was a pioneering engineer within acoustics, and started one of the first companies focused on acoustics. He celebrated his 100th birthday in March 2015.

Brüel & Kjær's pioneering achievements:

- 1940s – Various precision measurement instruments including radio frequency analyzers and Geiger counters.
- 1970s – Development of parallel analyzers, including the world's first analyzer to use digital filters.
- 1980s – Introduction of the first commercially available instrument for sound intensity measurement and the expansion of the range of instruments.
- 1990s – Multichannel and multi-analysis systems, including acoustical holography array systems.
- 2000s – Surface microphones and new technologies such as TEDS, Dyn-X, REq- X, and LAN-XI.

== Publications ==
- Brüel, Per (1951). Sound Insulation and Room Acoustics. London: Chapman & Hall.
