= Microphone array =

Group of microphones operating in tandem

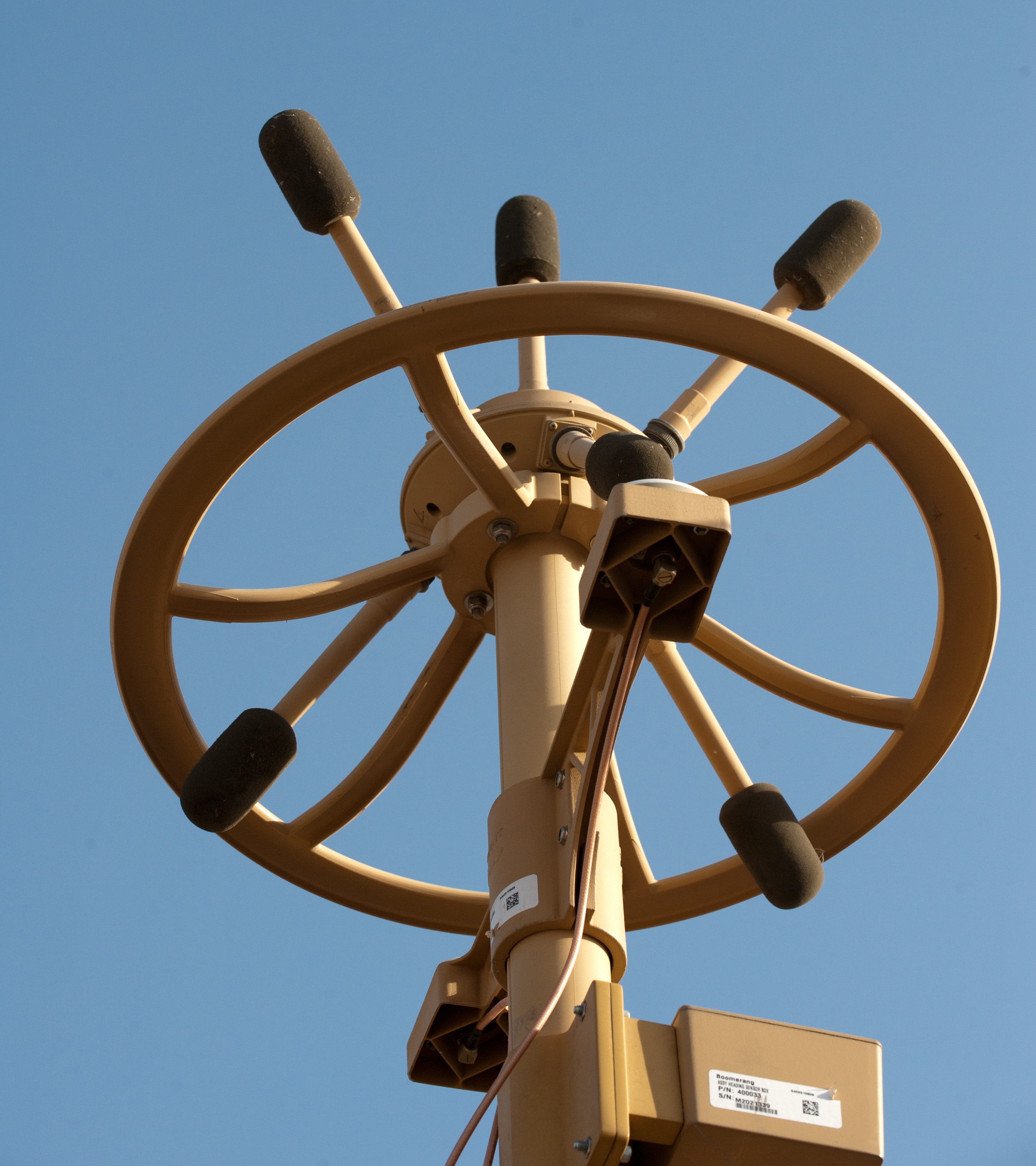
A gunfire locator using a microphone array

A microphone array is any number of microphones operating in tandem. There are many applications:

- Systems for extracting voice input from ambient noise (notably telephones, speech recognition systems, hearing aids)
- Surround sound and related technologies
- Binaural recording
- Locating objects by sound: acoustic source localization, e.g., military use to locate the source(s) of artillery fire. Aircraft location and tracking.
- High fidelity original recordings
- Environmental noise monitoring
- Robotic navigation (acoustic SLAM)

Typically, an array is made up of omnidirectional microphones, directional microphones, or a mix of omnidirectional and directional microphones distributed about the perimeter of a space, linked to a computer that records and interprets the results into a coherent form. Arrays may also be formed using numbers of very closely spaced microphones. Given a fixed physical relationship in space between the different individual microphone transducer array elements, simultaneous DSP (digital signal processor) processing of the signals from each of the individual microphone array elements can create one or more "virtual" microphones. Different algorithms permit the creation of virtual microphones with extremely complex virtual polar patterns and even the possibility to steer the individual lobes of the virtual microphones patterns so as to home-in-on, or to reject, particular sources of sound. The application of these algorithms can produce varying levels of accuracy when calculating source level and location, and as such, care should be taken when deciding how the individual lobes of the virtual microphones are derived.

In case the array consists of omnidirectional microphones they accept sound from all directions, so electrical signals of the microphones contain the information about the sounds coming from all directions. Joint processing of these sounds allows selecting the sound signal coming from the given direction.

An array of 1020 microphones, the largest in the world until August 21, 2014, was built by researchers at the MIT Computer Science and Artificial Intelligence Laboratory.

Currently the largest microphone array in the world was constructed by DLR, the German Aerospace Center, in 2024. Their array consists of 7200 microphones with an aperture of 8 m x 6 m.

== Soundfield microphone ==
The soundfield microphone system is a well-established example of the use of a microphone array in professional sound recording.

== See also ==
- Acoustic camera
- Acoustic source localization
- Ambisonics
- Decca tree
- Microphone
- SOSUS
- Stereophonic sound
- Surround sound
