= Rose Bay Secondary College =

Location
- Dover Heights, Eastern Sydney, New South Wales; Australia; 33°52′42″S 151°16′38″E

Information
- Type: Government-funded co-educational dual modality partially academically selective and comprehensive secondary day school
- Motto: Opportunity Achievement Community
- Established: 2003; 23 years ago
- School district: Bondi; Metropolitan South
- Educational authority: New South Wales Department of Education
- Principal: Cathy Archer
- Teaching staff: 69
- Years: 7–12
- Enrolment: 1,425 (2016)
- Campus type: Suburban
- Colours: Red, navy blue, and white
- Website: rosebay-h.schools.nsw.gov.au

Rose Bay Secondary College (RBSC) is a government-funded co-educational dual modality partially academically selective and comprehensive secondary day school, located in Dover Heights, an eastern Sydney suburb of New South Wales, Australia. The New South Wales Department of Education established the college in 2003 as a result of the merger of Dover Heights and Vaucluse high schools.

The catchment includes the South Head Peninsula and Northern area of the Eastern Suburbs of Sydney and is roughly bounded by Sydney Harbour to the north, Randwick to the south, Surry Hills to the West and the Pacific Ocean to the east. The college also takes in a number of out of area enrolments, including students from around Sydney who are academically selected and enrolled as members of the college's selective classes. The main feeder schools are Bellevue Hill PS, Bondi Beach PS, Bondi PS, Bronte PS, Clovelly PS, Double Bay PS, Glenmore Road PS, Paddington PS, Rose Bay PS, Vaucluse PS, Waverley PS and Woollahra PS with a number of students coming from Roman Catholic and Independent primary schools.

== History ==
The college was established in 2003, following the merger of Dover Heights High School and Vaucluse High School. The college initially operated using both campuses while construction commenced on extending and expanding the buildings and facilities at the former site of Dover Heights High School. The name, "Rose Bay Secondary College" was chosen after community consultation

Dover Heights High School was itself the result of a merger between Dover Heights Boys High School and Dover Heights Girls High School in 1982.

== Curriculum ==
The college follows the mandated statewide curriculum developed by the New South Wales Board of Studies. Students in Years 7 to 10 undertake studies in Mathematics, English, Science, History, Geography, Music, Film Studies, Visual Arts, Dance, Technological & Applied Studies (Metalwork, Woodwork and Home Economics), Languages (German, Hebrew, Italian, Japanese, Russian or Spanish), and Personal Development, Health and Physical Education as well as Philosophy.

Years 11 and 12 students undertake various units in courses developed by the Board of Studies, including studies in English, mathematics, science, technology, creative arts, personal development, health and physical education, history, geography, languages and Vocational Education and Training. Students may opt for units developed by the Open High School as correspondence courses. Students in Years 11 and 12 also have the opportunity to undertake a variety of courses endorsed by the Board of Studies and developed by the college itself or by Australian universities, TAFE institutes and other schools.

The majority of students continue their education at university or TAFE, with a smaller number going into apprenticeships or into the workforce.

=== Support classes ===
The school provides support for students who have mild and moderate intellectual disabilities and autism to undertake studies either in specially grouped classes or alongside their peers with support in mainstream classes. Students in these classes have the option to continue to Year 11 and Year 12, where they undertake a tailored program to allow for them to transition to post-school employment, further vocational education or employment.

=== Selective classes and gifted education ===
In 2005 the college was established as a partially selective high school together with a number of other Sydney high schools, and takes on two classes of approximately 50 to 60 students in each year enrolled on the basis of their intellectual giftedness.

Students are placed into the selective classes at enrolment in Year 7 on the basis of high achievement across the curriculum and on the Selective Schools Placement Test taken by students in their final year of primary school. After the beginning of Year 7, students are placed into the selective classes by the college on a student by student basis. The college also provides for gifted students not enrolled in the Selective classes through a variety of grouping strategies, and differentiation of the curriculum for those specific groups.

=== maGneT program ===
Coordinated in conjunction with the principals of nearby primary schools, the school runs a program for highly and divergently gifted students in Years 5 and 6. These students come to the college for one day a week across a term and undertake advanced studies in a range of different areas. This program provides the opportunity for these gifted students to extend well beyond the normal learning that they would usually undertake.

In 2010, 65 students from 11 local primary schools were involved in the program. These students were nominated by the primary schools for the program on the basis of their giftedness. These students undertake advanced studies in a number of areas that diverge from the usual syllabi for year 5 and 6 students. The units developed for the maGneT program include activities based in Laws & Ethics, Future Studies, Norse Civilisation, Historical Fiction and Cryptography among others.

== Co-curricular activities ==
Students are able to join a number of co-curricular activities including debating & public speaking, Duke of Edinburgh Award Scheme and a variety of performing arts programs in Music, Dance and Film. A number of students at the school have had successes in co-curricular areas, including Marta Santos-Mariz' sculpture, entitled Decline being included in Art Express 2011.

=== Musical ===
Students and staff at the college produce a musical once every 2 years. These have included "Footloose the Musical" in 2010, "Little Shop of Horrors" in 2012, "The Wedding Singer" in 2014, " The Adams Family " in 2016 and "Legally Blonde" in 2018", and a release of "Grease" in 2023.

=== V-Fest ===
The college coordinates V-Fest, a festival for films created by secondary students. The festival has been run since 1999 (at which point it was coordinated by Vaucluse High School).

Entrants are sought from public and private secondary schools across the Sydney Metropolitan area in two divisions, a Junior Division (for years 7–10) and a Senior Division (for years 11–12). Noteworthy entrants are shown at the Chauvel Cinema in nearby Paddington. Entries are judged by a panel of experts and prizes are awarded to winners and second and third runners-up in each division as well as to the most popular film on the night as judged by the audience.

In 2010, Burwood Girls High School won the Junior Division.

In 2017 many films including The Struggle entered the junior division.

=== Music ===
A subcommittee of the P&C oversees a Music Ensemble Program which consists of a number of music groups, including a senior and junior concert bands, junior and senior stage bands, jazz bands, a rock choir, a vocal ensemble, a string ensemble, a percussion ensemble, and multiple rock bands. The music programs have received a number of accolades, including Gold, Silver and Bronze awards for various groups at the School Band Festival. These musical groups, as well as other independent bands, play in year-round events such as 'Battle of the Bands', Valentine's Day, Wear it Purple Day, and Halloween.

=== Life saving and surf awareness ===
As many of its students are from the beachside Eastern suburbs of Sydney, the college coordinates a Surf Awareness program with one of Bondi Beach's Surf Life Saving Clubs, the North Bondi Surf Life Saving Club. The goal of the week-long program is to provide Year 7 students with an opportunity to develop their skills and awareness regarding swimming at the beach. The students are separated into different groups according to their swimming ability and familiarity with beach swimming. At the culmination of the week, a Surf Carnival is organised with all students participating.

=== World Kindness Week ===
To counter bullying, in 2010 the year 10 Vision Project initiated a campaign promoting kindness. Year 7 hosted a wishing tree. Delegates to the World Kindness Movement's 6th General Assembly were taken during World Kindness Week to Rose Bay Secondary College where teachers and students hosted a morning tea and presented the school initiative for kindness.

== Campus facilities ==
The college is situated on a sloping block of land extending back from Hardy Street in Dover Heights. The site is close by to Bondi Beach, and the college makes use of the beach where it is able. The school has uninterrupted views West to Sydney Harbour and the Sydney CBD.

The college occupies one building with three connected blocks. These blocks include the historical buildings that comprised Dover Heights Girls High School and the extensions and renovations to that site completed in 2006. The blocks are arranged down the slope from Hardy Street in the East to the fields in the West. As such, the higher floors of the school are on the Eastern side, progressing down to the lower floors on the Western side.

Block A, in levels 4 to 7, situated by Hardy Street, houses the administrative and executive offices, Technical and Applied Studies staffroom, the Social Sciences, History and languages staffroom, classrooms for History, Geography and Mathematics, Metalwork, Woodwork, Home Economics, Languages and Visual Arts rooms, a Dance Studio, The school Hall and purpose built special education classrooms. For the most part, Block A is the site of Dover Heights Girls High School in its original state. Block B in levels 3 to 6, situated on the South of the site, houses the Mathematics, English, Home economics and Visual Arts staffroom, the staff common room, the School Library, classrooms and labs for Computing, and classrooms for English and Science. Block C, in levels 1 and 2, is situated on the West of the site, houses the Music, PDHPE, Science, Computing and Creative and Performing Arts staffroom, classrooms for Music, PDHPE and Film, A broadcasting room and two partial levels of staff carparks A fourth Block is located opposite to Block B and sometimes referred to as Block D, houses the school gymnasium and the "locker room", a room with lockers.

The canteen is a small, separate building in the middle of the school. The school also has basketball courts and one oval on the West of the site.

== See also ==
- List of government schools in New South Wales
- List of selective high schools in New South Wales
