= Smaart =

Audio measurement software

- Smaart 7 in transfer view
- Developer: Rational Acoustics
- Stable release: v9.5.1 / February 21, 2025
- Operating system: Windows 10 or newer, macOS Mojave or newer
- Platform: x86-64
- Type: Acoustical measurement
- Website: http://www.rationalacoustics.com

Smaart (System Measurement Acoustical Analysis in Real Time) is a suite of audio and acoustical measurements and instrumentation software tools introduced in 1996 by JBL's professional audio division. It is designed to help the live sound engineer optimize sound reinforcement systems before public performance and actively monitor acoustical parameters in real time while an audio system is in use. Most earlier analysis systems required specific test signals sent through the sound system, ones that would be unpleasant for the audience to hear. Smaart is a source-independent analyzer and therefore will work effectively with a variety of test signals including speech or music.

The product has been known as JBL-SMAART, SIA-SMAART Pro, EAW SMAART, and SmaartLive. As of 2008 the product has been branded as simply Smaart. An acoustician version has been offered as Smaart Acoustic Tools, however as of Smaart v7.4, Acoustic Tools have been included within the Impulse Response mode of Smaart. A standalone sound pressure level monitoring-only version called Smaart SPL was released in 2020.

Smaart is a real-time single and dual-channel fast Fourier transform (FFT) analyzer. Smaart has two modes: Real-Time Mode and impulse response mode. Real-time mode views include single channel Spectrum and dual channel Transfer Function measurements to display RTA, Spectrograph, and Transfer Function (Live IR, Phase, Coherence, Magnitude) measurements. The impulse response mode will display time domain graphs such as Lin (Linear), Log (Logarithmic), ETC (Energy Time Curve), as well as Frequency, Spectrograph, and Histogram graphs. Impulse Response mode also includes a suite of acoustical intelligibly criteria such as STI, STIPA, Clarity, RT60, EDT, etc.

Smaart has been licensed and owned by several companies since JBL and is currently owned and developed by Rational Acoustics. First written as a native Windows 3.1 application to work within Windows 95 on IBM PC–compatible computers, in 2006 a version was introduced that was compatible on both Windows and Apple Macintosh operating systems. As of March 2016 Smaart was in its 8th version.

== Use ==
Smaart is based on real-time fast Fourier transform (FFT) analysis, including dual-FFT audio signal comparison, called "transfer function", and single-FFT spectrum analyzer. It includes maximum length sequence (MLS) analysis as a choice for impulse response, for the measurement of room acoustics. The FFT implementation of Smaart includes a proprietary multi-time window (MTW) selection in which the FFT, rather than being a fixed length, is made increasingly shorter as the frequency increases. This feature allows the software to 'ignore' later signal reflections from walls and other surfaces, increasing in coherence as the audio frequency increases.

The latest version of Smaart 8 runs under Windows 7 or newer, and Mac OSX 10.7 or newer, including 32- and 64-bit versions. A computer having a dual-core processor with a clock rate of at least 2 GHz is recommended. Smaart can be set to sample rates of 44.1 kHz, 48 kHz or 96 kHz, and to bit depths of 16 or 24. The software works with computer audio protocols ASIO, Core Audio, WAV or WDM audio drivers.

=== Transfer function ===
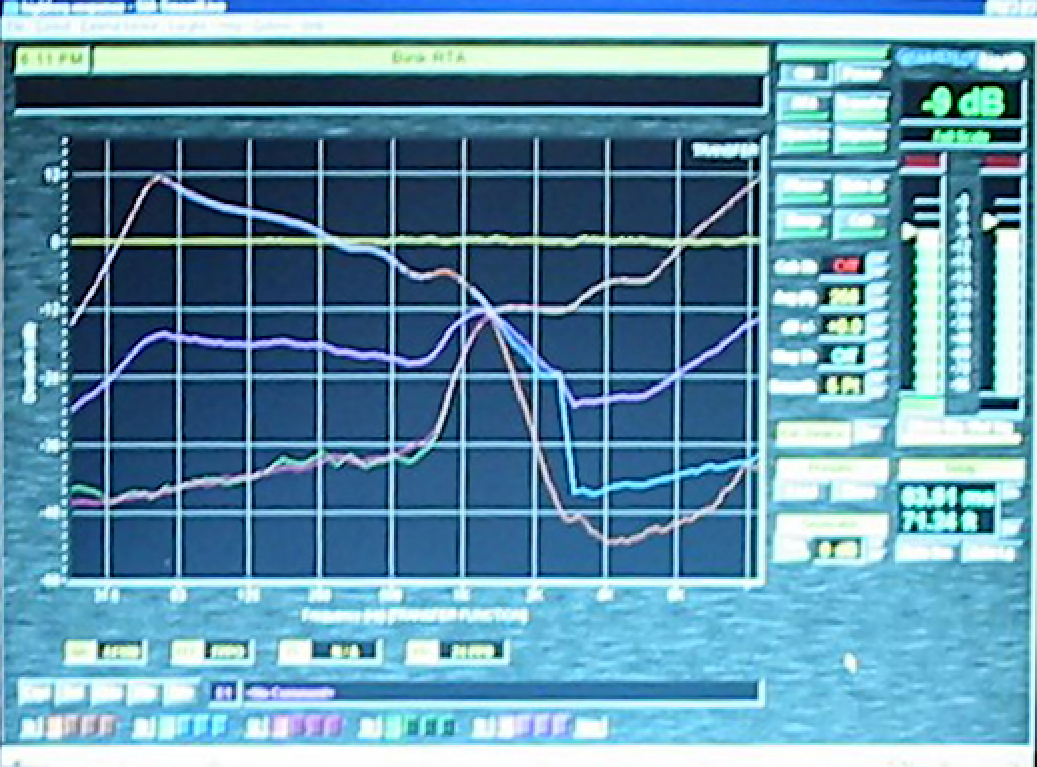
SmaartLive version 4 in transfer function mode, showing several captured traces of an active crossover

Smaart's transfer function requires a stereo input to the computer because it analyzes two channels of audio signal. Using its dual-FFT mode, Smaart compares one channel with the other to show the difference. This is used by live sound engineers to set up concert sound systems before a show and to monitor and adjust these systems during the performance. The first channel of audio undergoing analysis is connected directly from one of the main outputs of the mixing console and the second channel is connected to a microphone placed in the audience listening area, usually an omnidirectional test microphone with a flat, neutral pickup characteristic. The direct mixing console audio output is compared with the microphone input to determine how the sound is changed by the sound system elements such as loudspeakers and amplifiers, and by the room acoustics indoors or by the weather conditions and acoustic environment outdoors. Smaart displays the difference between the intended sound from the mixer and the received sound at the microphone, and this real-time display informs the audio engineer's decisions regarding delay times, equalization and other sound system adjustment parameters.

Although pink noise is a traditional choice for test signal, Smaart is a source-independent analyzer, which means that it does not rely on a specific test signal to produce measurement data. Pink noise is still in common usage because its energy distribution allows for quick measurement acquisition, but music or another broadband test signal can be used instead.

Transfer function measurements can also be used to examine the frequency response of audio equipment, including individual amplifiers, loudspeakers and digital signal processors such as audio crossovers and equalizers. It can be used to compare a known neutral-response test microphone with another microphone in order to better understand its frequency response and, by changing the angle of the microphone under test, its polar response.

Transfer function measurements can be used to adjust audio crossover settings for multi-way loudspeakers; similarly, they can be used to adjust only the subwoofer-to-top box crossover characteristics in a sound system where the main, non-subwoofer loudspeakers are flown or rigged but the subwoofers are placed on the ground. One of the traces in the Smaart display shows phase response. To properly align adjacent frequency bands through a crossover, the two phase responses should be adjusted until they are seen in Smaart to be parallel through the crossover frequency.

The transfer function measurement can be used to measure frequency-related electrical impedance, one of the electrical characteristics of dynamic loudspeakers. Grateful Dead sound system engineer "Dr. Don" Pearson worked out the method in 2000, using Smaart to compare the voltage drop through a simple resistor between a loudspeaker and a random noise generator.

=== Real-time analyzer ===
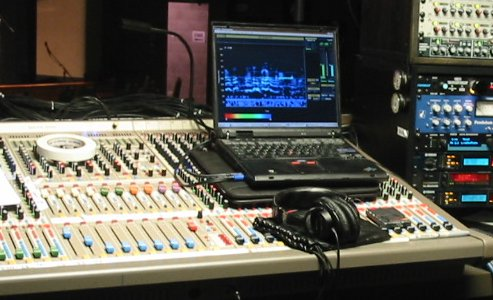
Smaart running as a spectrum analyzer, in spectrograph view

In spectrograph view, Smaart displays a real-time spectrum analysis, showing the relative strength of audio frequencies for one audio signal. Needing only one channel of audio input, this capability can be used for a variety of purposes. With Smaart's input connected to the mixing console's pre-fade listen (PFL) or cue bus, spectrograph view can display the frequency response of individual channels, several selected channels, or various mixes. Spectrograph mode can be used to display room resonances: pink noise is applied to the room's sound system, and the signal from a test microphone in the room is displayed on Smaart. When the pink noise is muted, the display shows the lingering tails of noise frequencies that are resonating.

=== Impulse response ===
Smaart can be used to find the delay time between two signals, in which case the computer needs two input channels and the software uses a transfer function measurement engine. Called "Delay Locator", the software calculates the impulse responses of two continuous audio signals, finding the similarities in the signals and measuring how much time has elapsed between them. This is used to set delay times for delay towers at large outdoor sound systems, and it is used to set delay times for other loudspeaker zones in smaller systems. Veteran Van Halen touring sound engineer Jim Yakabuski calls such delay locator programs as Smaart a "must have" item, useful for quickly aligning sound system elements when setup time is limited.

== Market ==
Smaart is primarily aimed at sound system operators to assist them in setting up and tuning sound systems. Other users include audio equipment designers and architectural acousticians. Author and sound engineer Bob McCarthy wrote in 2007 that because of Smaart's widespread acceptance at all levels of live sound mixing, the paradigm has reversed from the 1980s one of surprise at finding scientific tools in the concert sound scene to one of surprise if the observer finds that such tools are not being used to tune a sound system.

Smaart has been compared to other software-based sound system measurement tools such as SIM by Meyer Sound Laboratories and IASYS by Audio Control, both of which offer delay finder tools. Smaart has been described as "a newer, slimmer and much cheaper—but not necessarily better—version of the Meyer SIM system." MLSSA, developed by DRA Laboratories in 1987, and TEF, a time delay spectrometry product by Gold Line, are other products predating Smaart that are used to tune loudspeakers such as studio monitors. A software tool that reached Mac users in 1997 was named SpectraFoo, by Metric Halo. At the same time, some early Smaart users found that after tweaking their MIDI drivers they could get Smaart to work on an Apple computer, the software running inside an x86 emulator such as SoftWindows "with varying results".

== History ==
JBL-Smaart version 1.0 demo for Windows 3.1 (1995)

As early as 1978, field analysis of rock concert audio was undertaken by Don Pearson, known by his nickname "Dr. Don", while working on sound systems used by the Grateful Dead. Pearson published articles about impulse response measurements taken during setup and testing of concert sound systems, and recommended the Dead buy an expensive Brüel & Kjær 2032 Dual Channel FFT analyzer, made for industrial engineering. Along with Dead audio engineer Dan Healy, Pearson developed methods of working with this system to set up sound systems on tour, and he assisted Meyer engineers working on a more suitable source-independent measurement system which was to become their SIM product. As well, Pearson had an "intimate involvement" with the engineers who were creating Smaart, including a meeting with Jamie Anderson.

Smaart was developed by Sam Berkow in association with Alexander "Thorny" Yuill-Thornton II, touring sound engineer with Luciano Pavarotti and The Three Tenors. In 1995, Berkow and Thorny founded SIA Software Company, produced Smaart and licensed the product to JBL. First exhibited in New York City at the Audio Engineering Society's 99th convention in October 1995 and described the next month in Billboard magazine, in May 1996 the software product was introduced at the price of $695, the equivalent of $1,427 in today's currency. Studio Sound magazine described Smaart in 1996 as "the most talked about new product" at the 100th AES convention in Copenhagen, exemplifying a new trend in software audio measurement. Calvert Dayton joined SIA Software in 1996 as graphic designer, technical writer and website programmer.

Smaart was unusual because it helped audio professionals such as theatrical sound designers do what was previously possible only with highly sophisticated and expensive measurement devices. Audio system engineers from Clair Brothers used Smaart to tune the sound system at each stop during U2's PopMart Tour 1997–1998. As it increased in popularity, engineers who used Smaart found mixed results: touring veteran Doug Fowler wrote that "misuse was rampant" when the software first started appearing in the field. He warned users against faulty interpretation, saying "I still see bad decisions based on bad data, or bad decisions based on a fundamental lack of understanding of the issues at hand." Nevertheless, Clive Young, editor of Pro Sound News, wrote in 2005 that the introduction of Smaart in 1995 was the start of "the modern era of sound reinforcement system analysis software".

In 1998, JBL Smaart Pro won the TEC Awards category for computer software and peripherals. Eastern Acoustic Works (EAW) bought SIA Software, and brought in Jamie Anderson to manage the division. Version 3 was introduced under EAW's ownership, with the additional capability of accepting optional plug-ins which could be used to apply sound system adjustments, as measured by Smaart, to digital signal processing (DSP) equipment. The external third party DSP would perform the corrections indicated by Smaart.

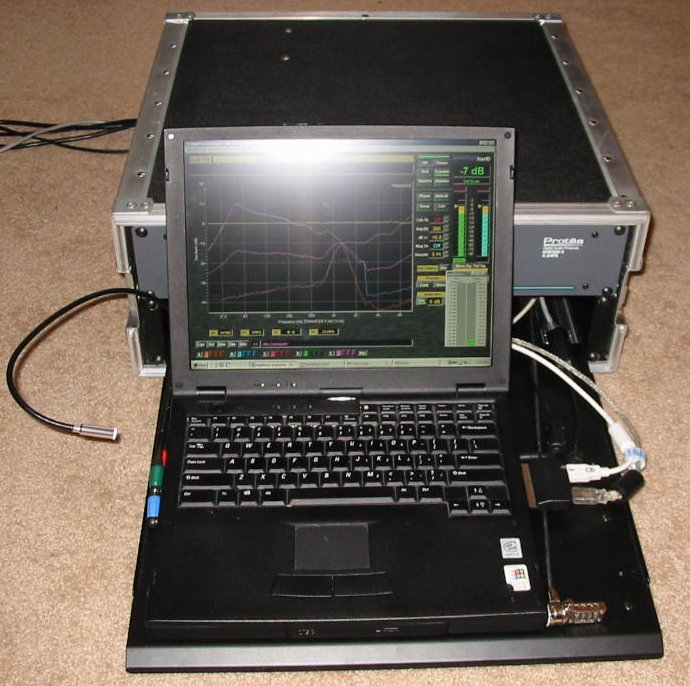
SmaartLive 4 software running on an IBM laptop in 2002, mounted in a portable 19-inch rack case

Versions 4 and 5 were built upon the foundation of version 3, but with each major release, the application was getting more and more difficult to write, and further improvements appeared practically impossible to implement. For version 6, the designers decided to tear Smaart back down to its basics and rebuild it on a flexible multi-tasking, multi-platform framework which would allow it to be used on Mac OS X and Windows machines. Writing it took two years, and it was released in a package which included the earlier version 5 because there was not enough time to incorporate all elements of the existing feature set. Anderson said in 2007, "we released Version 6 without all of the features of 5, but we are adding those features back in." Smaart 6 was nominated for a TEC Award in 2007 but did not win.

EAW developed a digital mixing console prototype in 2005, the UMX.96; a console which incorporated SmaartLive 5 internally. Any selected channel on the mixer could be used as a source for Smaart analysis, displaying, for instance, the real-time results of channel equalization. The console could be configured to send multiple microphone inputs to Smaart, and it offered constant metering of sound pressure level in decibels. When it was put into production in 2007, band engineer Don Dodge took the mixer out on a world tour with Foreigner, the first concert mixed in March 2007. With its 15-inch touchscreen able to serve both audio control and Smaart analysis functions, Dodge continued to mix Foreigner on it throughout 2007 and 2008.

Rational Acoustics was incorporated on April 1, 2008. On November 9, 2009, under the leadership of Jamie and Karen Anderson, programmer Adam Black and technical chief Calvert Dayton, Rational Acoustics became the full owner of the Smaart brand. Rational released Smaart 7 on April 14, 2010; a version which uses less processing power than v5 and v6 because of efficiencies brought about in the redesigned code. Smaart 7 was written using a new object-oriented code architecture, it was given improved data acquisition. Other new features include graphic user interface changes and delay tracking. Users can run simultaneously displayed real-time measurements in multiple windows, as many as their computer hardware will allow. Smaart 7 was nominated in 2010 for a TEC Award but did not win. In April 2011, Smaart 7 was named one of four Live Design Sound Products of the Year 2010–2011.

== Version history ==
- May 1996 – JBL-Smaart 1.0
  - March 1997 – JBL-Smaart 1.4
- 1998 – SIA-Smaart Pro 2
- April 1999 – SIA-Smaart Pro 3
- 2000 – SIA SmaartLive 4
  - October 2000 – SIA SmaartLive 4.1
  - April 2001 – SIA SmaartLive 4.5
  - September 2001 – SIA SmaartLive 4.6
- June 2002 – SIA SmaartLive 5
  - October 2003 – SIA SmaartLive 5.3
- 2006 – EAW Smaart 6
- April 2010 – Smaart 7
  - October 2010 – Smaart 7.1
  - April 2011 – Smaart 7.2
  - July 2011 – Smaart 7.3
  - August 2012 - Smaart 7.4
  - April 2014 - Smaart 7.5
- March 2016 - Smaart 8.0
  - November 2016 – Smaart 8.1
  - December 2017 – Smaart 8.2
  - October 2018 – Smaart 8.3
  - November 2019 – Smaart 8.4
  - June 2020 - Smaart 8.5
- September 2022 - Smaart 9 (Suite, RT, LE, and SPL)
