= Apogee Electronics =

American audio equipment manufacturer

Apogee Electronics Corp.
- Logo as of 30 January 2010
- Industry: Consumer and professional audio electronics
- Founded: December 1985; 39 years ago
- Founders: Betty Bennett; Christof Heidelberger; Bruce Jackson
- Headquarters: Santa Monica, California, U.S.
- Key people: Betty Bennett (CEO)
- Number of employees: 35
- Parent: Rockforce Tech Holding Inc.
- Website: apogeedigital.com

Apogee Electronics is an American manufacturer of audio interfaces, analog-to-digital and digital-to-analog converters, USB & iOS microphones, and audio production software.

== History ==
Apogee Electronics was founded in December 1985 by former Soundcraft USA president Betty Bennett, audio engineer Bruce Jackson, and digital electronics designer Christof Heidelberger, after the three set out to improve the sound quality associated with early digital audio devices.

Apogee initially made its name designing anti-aliasing filters that solved many of the early problems associated with digital audio. Apogee's 944 filters could be used to upgrade the stock filters of Sony PCM-3324 24-track digital tape recorders, and later Mitsubishi ProDigi decks and DAT recorders. As an OEM, Apogee also provided low-jitter clocks and their UV22 encoder to other manufacturers.

In 1991, Apogee introduced its first outboard analog-to-digital (A-D) and digital-to-analog (D-A) converters, the AD-500 and AD-1000, each earning TEC Awards, as did the UV-1000 mastering processor and FC-8 digital format converter.

In 1998, the company continued to garner TEC awards with the AD8000, an 8-channel, 24-bit A-D converter with built-in low-jitter clock and UV22 encoder, and optional Apogee Multimedia Bus (AMBus) cards for interfacing with Pro Tools, or via ADAT or TDIF-equipped digital audio equipment. The Big Ben digital clock, Trak 2, AD16, and Mini-Me converter followed.

By 2005 the company had 25 employees, and relocated to a new headquarters on Berkeley Street in Santa Monica.

In 2006, Apogee began introducing a series of audio interfaces for Mac, beginning with the Symphony and Ensemble multi-channel interfaces. The following year, a 2-channel desktop audio interface, Duet, was introduced, followed by the 4-channel Quartet in 2012.

In November 2025, Apogee Electronics was acquired by Rockforce Tech Holding Inc.

== TEC awards ==
Apogee Electronics won NAMM Foundation and Technical Excellence & Creativity Awards (TEC Awards) in 2014, 2013, 2012, 2009, 2008, 2007, 2004, 2003, 2002, 2001, 1999, 1998, 1997, 1996, 1994, 1992 and 1988

== Apogee Studio ==
Apogee Studio is a recording studio located within Apogee Electronics' Santa Monica headquarters. Mixing engineer Bob Clearmountain, husband of Apogee's CEO Betty Bennett and consultant to the company, collaborated with Apogee in 2005 to convert unused space into a recording studio and performance venue.

Episode 6 of the first season of From the Basement, Nigel Godrich's web television series, was filmed at Apogee Studio rather than the show's usual filming location of London's Maida Vale Studios.

Beginning in 2010, Santa Monica radio station KCRW began hosting live music performances in the venue, called KCRW Apogee Sessions and later KCRW Live from Apogee Studio, with Clearmountain handling the audio engineering. Artists for these KCRW sessions have included David Gray, Ryan Adams, Chrissie Hynde, Patti Smith, Vampire Weekend, Nick Cave and the Bad Seeds, Regina Spektor, Glen Hansard, the Shins, k.d. lang, Shelby Lynne, Leon Bridges, Norah Jones, the Avett Brothers, Mayer Hawthorne, Alabama Shakes, Belle & Sebastian, John Legend, Beck, John Mayer, Common, and Queens of the Stone Age. In 2024, Cory Henry recorded his album Live at the Piano at the studio; the first recorded there to receive a Grammy Award nomination.

== Philanthropy and environment ==
Apogee Electronics supports non-profit organizations, including Corazón de Vida, CARE, Amnesty International, Plastic Pollution Coalition, the ONE Campaign, Save the Children, AmeriCares, MusiCares, Doctors Without Borders, UNICEF and Conservation International.

Apogee Electronics is a corporate partner of UCLA Institute of Environment and Sustainability, and is recognized as a Santa Monica certified Green Business. and won the Sustainable Quality Award.

Apogee is certified as a Women’s Business Enterprise (WBE) through the Women’s Business Enterprise National Council (WBENC).

Apogee has a certificate of compliance from the Waste Electrical and Electronic Equipment Directive (WEEE Directive). The WEEE Directive addresses the end-of-life (EOL) phase of products and contributes to the reduction of wasteful consumption of natural resources. The company has been solar powered since 2020.
