= Dover Heights Boys High School =

- Blake Street, Dover Heights, Sydney, New South Wales; Australia

Information
- Type: Public single-sex secondary day school
- Motto: Quit You Like Men
- Established: 1968
- Status: Closed and re-purposed
- Closed: 1982
- Gender: Boys only
- Campus type: Suburban
- Colours: Red, white and blue

Dover Heights Boys High School (abbreviated as DHBHS) was a former public single-sex secondary day school for boys, that was located in the eastern Sydney suburb of Dover Heights, New South Wales, Australia.

Established in 1968, the school was merged in 1982 with Dover Heights Girls High School to form Dover Heights High School, which was subsequently merged in 2003 with Vaucluse High School to form Rose Bay Secondary College.

== History ==
Dover Heights Boys High School traces its origins back to the Bondi Public School located on Wellington Street Bondi. Until 1944, Bondi Public served as both a primary and high school. In 1944, high school girls were moved to the new Dover Heights Home Science High School in Hardy Street in Dover Heights. Post primary boys continued on at Wellington Street – to be known as Bondi Junior Technical School, 1942–1963, and Bondi Junior High until 1969 when it was moved to a new building in Blake Street which was Dover Heights Boys' High School. Thus the Wellington Street school returned to the original name of Bondi Public School, becoming once again a primary school only.

As Bondi Junior Technical School, it only catered for boys from 1st to 4th form (year 7 to year 10), the Principal being Mr Cook. Late in 1967 Mr Doyle became the Principal. Since Mr Doyle was well placed in the education department, he pushed for a selective boys high school and in 1968 had the school renamed Bondi Boys High School. Mr Doyle was once asked why the senior girls from Dover Heights Girls High and senior boys from Vaucluse Boys High could not move to the Blake Street site, and instead move the junior boys to Vaucluse. His response was that the school would be a selective school for boys in the area only.

Construction of the Blake Street site commenced at the beginning of that year and completed for the start of the school year in 1969, when it was officially opened. During the 1970s it was known for applying corporal punishment beyond a reasonable measure, although during the period 1967 to 1972 this form of punishment was being phased out, with Masters only being able to administer such punishment. From 1971 onwards this was left to the Deputy Principal and Principal

The school's demise in 1982 was the result of falling enrolments. The likely reason for this was the changing demographics of nearby suburbs such as Bondi, Bronte and Clovelly which were originally working-class and thus a ready source of students for the state school system. The baby-boomer years (1945–1964) no doubt placed much pressure on the school system in the area and this may explain the reason for Dover Heights Boys' High School and Vaucluse Boys' High School (opened 1969 and 1960 respectively) coming into being. However, the 1970s saw these working-class families move to the more affordable western suburbs of Sydney and this, quite naturally had a detrimental effect on local state-school populations.

In 1982 the school was merged with Dover Heights Girls High School to form the Dover Heights High School on the campus of the girls' school. At the same time, Vaucluse Boys' High School became co-educational and renamed Vaucluse High School. The old Dover Heights Boys High School site was then offered for sale to Moriah College. This caused some controversy at the time and the sale did not proceed.

From 1986 to 1995, this site was occupied by Dover Heights College of TAFE.

It is now the site of the Kesser Torah College, a Jewish day school.

== Notable alumni ==
- Larry Emdur, television personality
