= Sound intensity probe =

A sound intensity probe is a probe capable of measuring sound intensity. The sound intensity is the product of sound pressure and particle velocity. Common probes measure the sound intensity using two microphones. Another type measures the sound intensity using a microphone and a particle velocity probe.

== Sound intensity ==
The sound intensity (in watts per square meter) is given by

$$I = pv$$

where

$p$ is sound pressure in pascals
$v$ is particle velocity in meters per second

== Devices ==
A p-p type of sound intensity probe measures the sound intensity using two phase-matched microphones. These microphones are usually positioned face-to-face and are used to determine a pressure gradient. From this pressure gradient it is possible to calculate the particle velocity. The sound pressure is determined from the average from both microphones output.

A p-u type of sound intensity probe measured both the sound pressure and the particle velocity directly. Sound pressure is measured using a microphone and particle velocity using a particle velocity probe

== Applications ==
Sound intensity probes are used for several applications. A common application is to determine the sound power of an object. Another application is locating a source of noise.

The use of sound intensity rather than sound pressure to determine sound power means that measurements can be made in situ, with steady background noise and in the near field of machines. The sound power is the average normal intensity over a surface enclosing the source, multiplied by the surface area.
