= Brüel & Kjær =

Danish multinational engineering and electronics company

Brüel & Kjær (Sound and Vibration Measurement A/S)
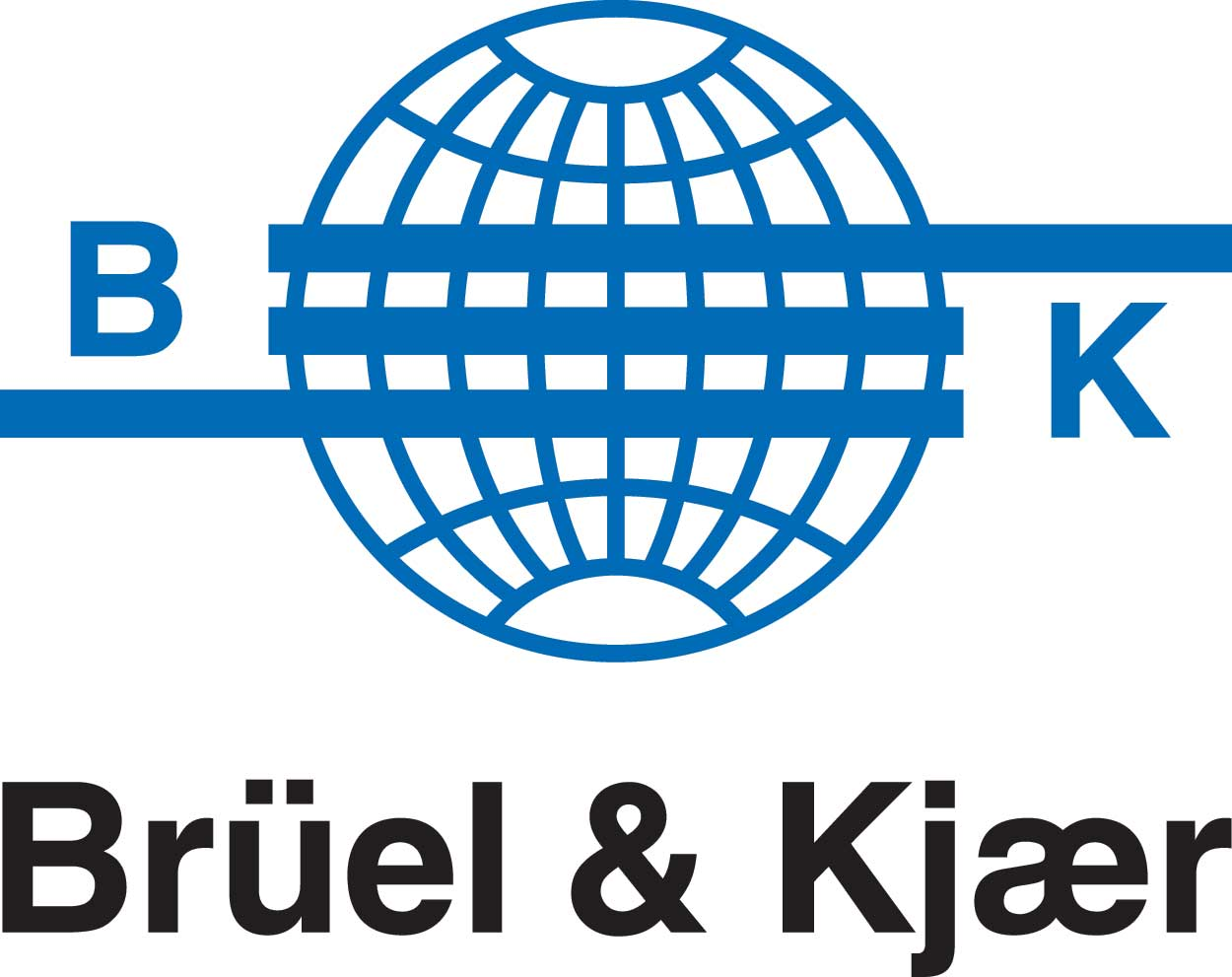

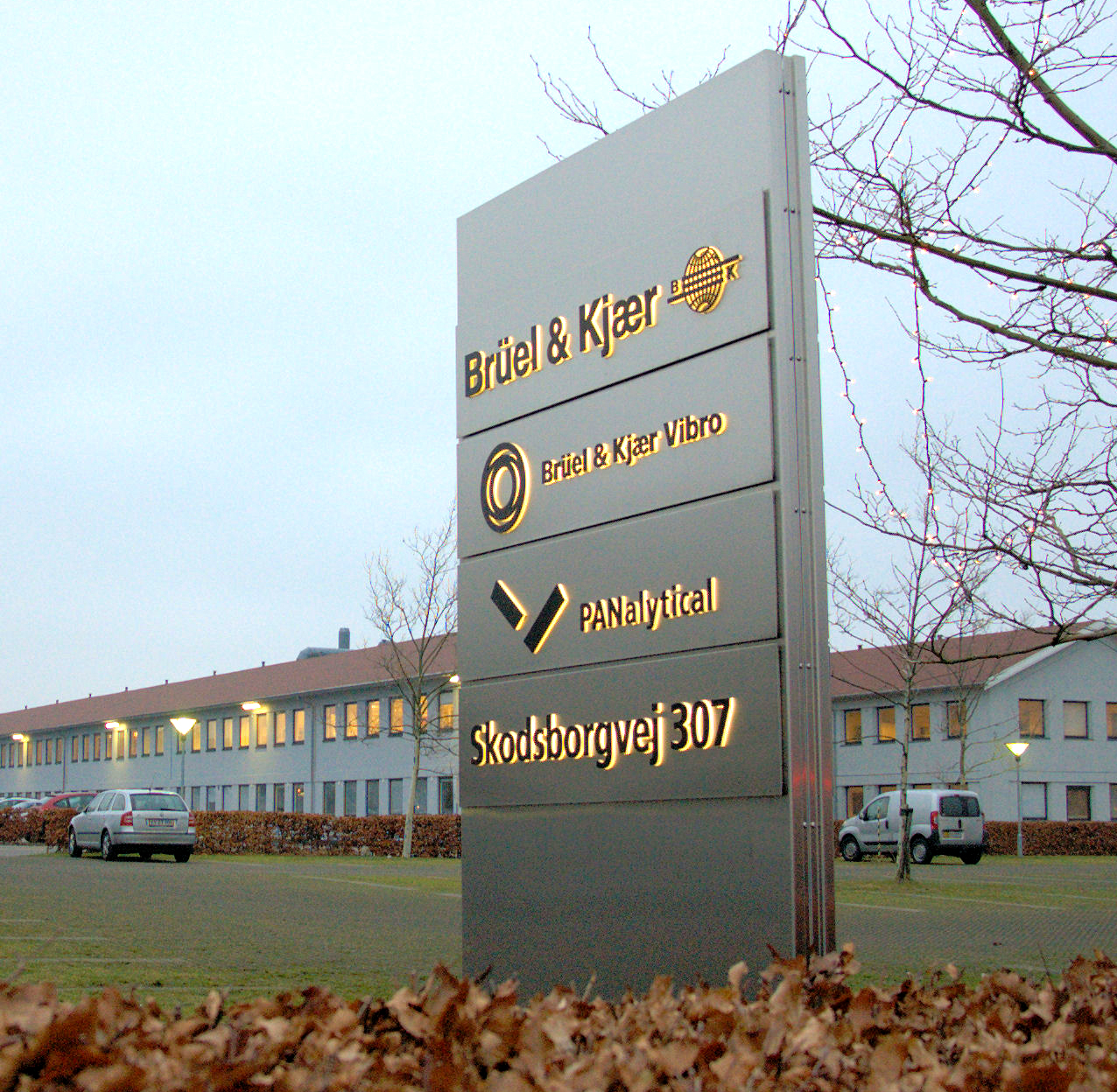
- Brüel & Kjær's headquarters in Naerum, Denmark
- Type: Private company
- Industry: Engineering; Sound & Vibration
- Founded: 28 November 1942
- Founder: Per Vilhelm Brüel and Viggo Kjær
- Headquarters: Nærum, Denmark
- Area served: Worldwide
- Products: Sound measurement, vibration systems
- Revenue: ▲DKK991 million (2011)
- Net income: ▲DKK186 million (2011)
- Number of employees: 1,150 (2013)
- Parent: Spectris
- Website: www.hbkworld.com

Brüel & Kjær (Sound and Vibration Measurement A/S) is a Danish multinational engineering and electronics company headquartered in Nærum, near Copenhagen. It was the largest producer in the world of equipment for acoustic and vibrational measurements. Brüel & Kjær is a subsidiary of Spectris.

Brüel & Kjær was founded on 28 November 1942 by Per Vilhelm Brüel (6 March 1915 – 2 April 2015) and Viggo Kjær (5 June 1914 – 25 July 2013), who met while studying at The Polytechnic School in Copenhagen (now the Technical University of Denmark). After accomplishing their M.S. degrees in 1939, they established a company which specializes in the development of acoustic measurement instruments.

Holger Nielsen joined the company as a third partner in 1945, and continued in that capacity until his death in 1978.

== Products ==
The most notable products and technologies developed by the company include:

- 1940s – Precision measurement instruments including radio frequency analyzers and Geiger counters. Type 2401, a vacuum tube voltmeter, was the first instrument produced. Type 4301, launched in 1943, was the world's first charge accelerometer, while Type 2301 marked the success of the company in 1949. Since then it has been updated a number of times: the latest version, Type 2307, was introduced in 1972
- 1950s – Sound and vibration measurements tools, including logarithmic level recorders, signal generators and frequency analyzers
- 1960s – Measurement microphones, preamplifiers and calibrators, along with IEC standardised precision sound level meters
- 1970s – Parallel analyzers, including the first analyzer using digital filters
- 1980s – The first instrument for sound intensity measurement; dual channel FFT analyzers
- 1990s – Multichannel and multi-analysis systems, including acoustical holography array systems
- 2000s – Surface microphones, LAN-XI modular data acquisition hardware and TEDS, Dyn-X, REq-X technologies

== Markets ==
=== Aero engines ===
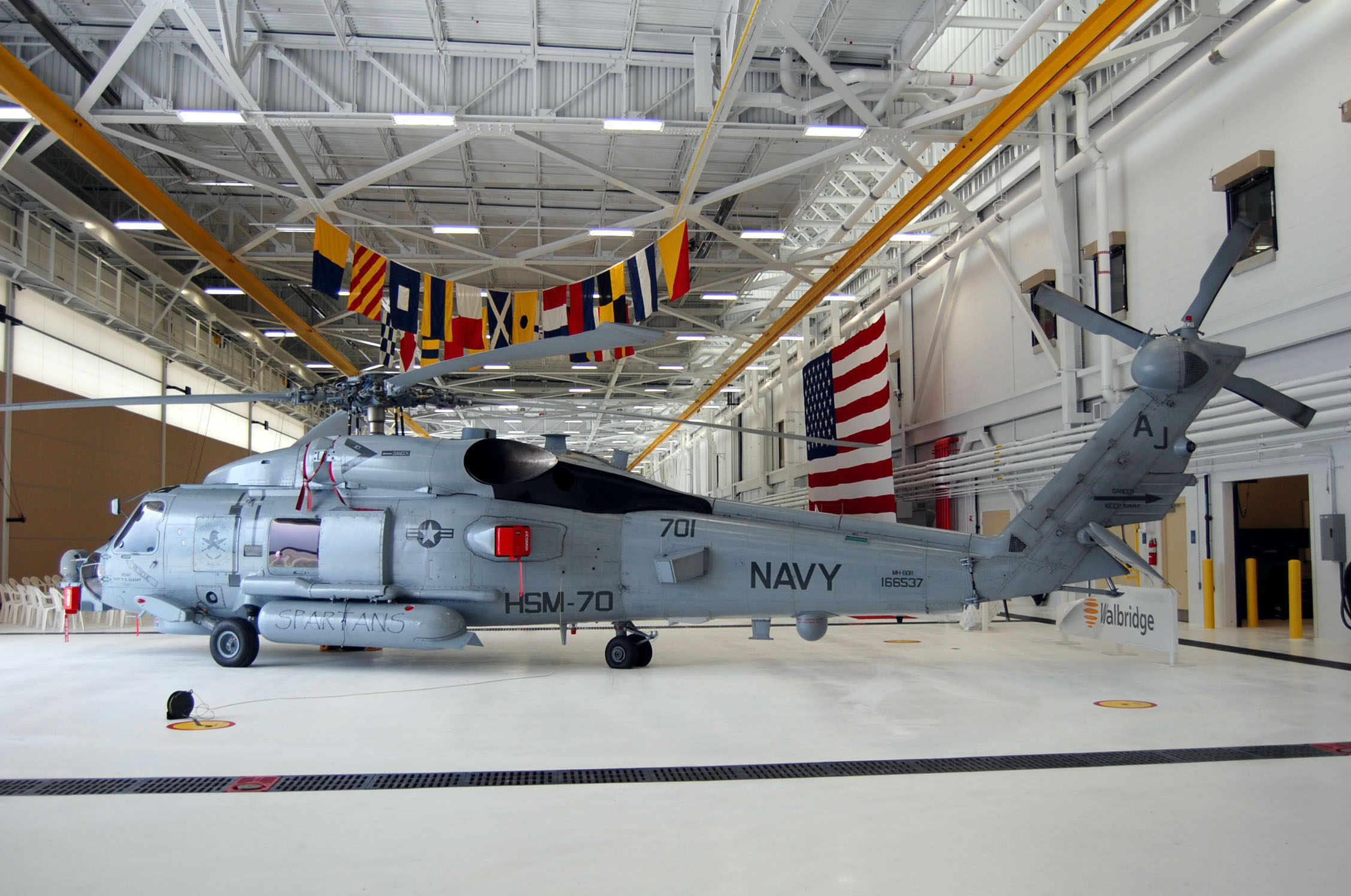
Brüel & Kjaer delivers technologies for the Sikorsky MH-60R which was chosen by the RDAF as replacement for the Lynx helicopter in 2012

Brüel & Kjær (now HBK) provides tools to overcome noise and vibration challenges. These ensure the quality of new lighter material applications by modal testing and improving the quality and test efficiency in aero engines. Systems include those for development and measurement of new noise-optimised engines, acoustic lining designs and propagation code validation (engine duct modal analysis, far-field noise measurement, and acoustic panel in situ impedance measurement) It also supplies in-flight engine monitoring with flight-certified, high-temperature accelerometers.

=== Aerospace ===
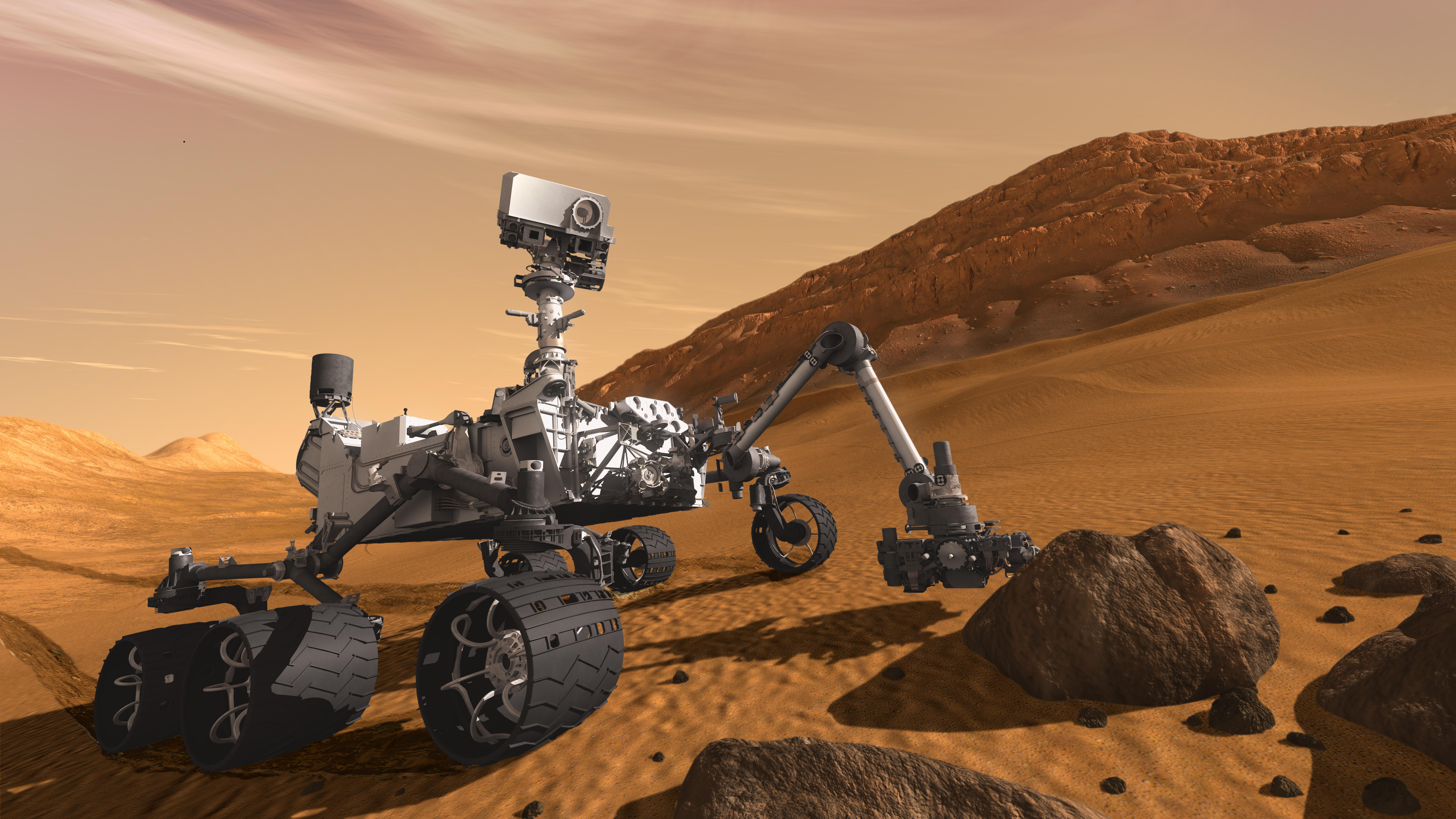
NASA's Mars rover 'Curiosity' was tested using a Brüel and Kjær LDS shaker system

Brüel & Kjær supplies data acquisition systems and vibration test systems (LDS) to customers in the aerospace industry, such as the LDS V994 shaker, used to test NASA's Mars Curiosity rover. Other systems have tested Astrium's satellite prior to launch, and performed qualification and acceptance testing, such as the integrated LAN-XI data acquisition systems used by the National Institute for Space Research in Brazil INPE. Main customers in this field are Airbus, Aircraft Strength Research Institute, Boeing, EADS, Eurocopter, Rolls-Royce, and Sukhoi.

=== Defence ===
==== Acoustic stealth discretion ====
The company supplies systems for noise signature management: acoustic ranging of submarines and surface ships; noise source investigation during design and build; acoustic trials and self-noise monitoring during operations. It also supplies systems for underwater acoustics, shock testing, noise and vibration testing and structural dynamics testing.

==== Identifying noise sources ====
Brüel & Kjær makes several products in audio measurement, ranging from simple sound level measurements to sophisticated microphone array systems using advanced algorithms and hardware. These products are provided for air-vehicle noise certification, exterior noise analysis such as fly-over testing using acoustic holography, beamforming, SONAH and high-temperature sensors, noise source identification to examine, for example, ramp noise or sonic booms, microphone calibration systems and more.

==== Maintaining operational integrity ====
The company provides products that aid preventative maintenance and manufacturer-specified checks to prolong the health of engines. Real-time multi-analysis capabilities reduce the number of run‑ups/‑downs and gather more data faster for analyses ranging from simple pass-fail overall measurements to in-depth advanced analysis in order to maximize the up-time of aircraft. It offers high-temperature accelerometers that can monitor the health of operational machinery for maintenance, repair and overhaul tasks such as balancing, trim balancing, on-ground engine vibration checks, vibration diagnostics and re-run production tests using real-time analysis. Furthermore, it provides monitoring systems for engines and gearboxes with permanently placed HUMS sensors and signal conditioners for extreme environments.

==== Environmental noise impact testing and monitoring ====
Brüel & Kjær supplies systems for occupational health, helmet/cabin/cockpit noise assessment, acoustic and human vibration monitoring, urban noise monitoring and noise-mapping of vehicles in order to test and monitor the environmental noise impact, and to look for ways of reducing environmental noise impact on armed forces personnel and local communities. These activities include helmet/cabin/cockpit noise assessment, human acoustic and vibration monitoring, urban, airport, industrial and construction noise monitoring, and vehicle noise mapping.

==== Wind tunnel testing ====
Since wind tunnel and test track measurements are often the only way to recreate real-world conditions for model and mule car testing, and are also a good method of validating simulated model data, Brüel & Kjær tries to provide measurement devices that focus on these types of tests, for specific needs so that they can perform vehicle pass-by noise contribution studies for cars, trucks and trains, location of high-frequency engine noise sources, and wind-tunnel measurements. Surface microphones mounted on the exterior of a vehicle measure the pressure fluctuations at different positions of the vehicle without drilling holes. Beamforming can be used for noise mapping at a distance from large objects. The data for all points is acquired in a single measurement, saving time and effort.

==== Setting targets ====
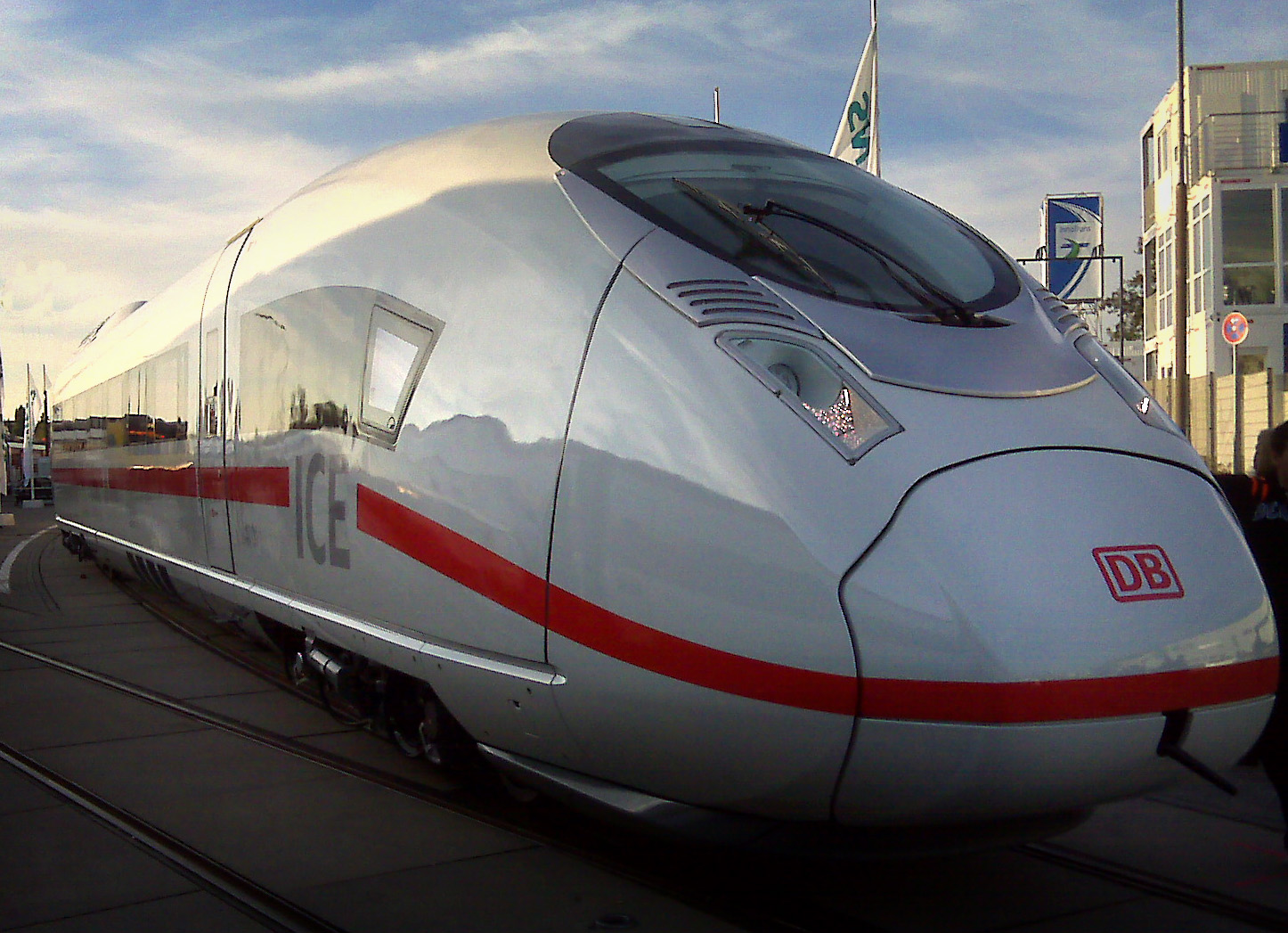
Trains and ground vehicles are also a major market for Brüel & Kjær

Brüel & Kjær provide the tools for recording, analysing, auditioning, dissecting, and synthesising sounds. The range enables the use of simulation models and test data to develop modifications to improve the sound quality and to achieve the ultimate objective of designing the desired sound characteristics into the product.

==== Benchmarking ====
Brüel & Kjær has developed an NVH tool for surreptitious recording and analysis called SoNoScout. It can be carried in the tester's pocket on a train or bus without distracting the passengers or in a competitor's vehicle where it can be combined with a GPS unit to generate a map of the test route, measure speed and even generate an RPM profile. The software runs on a PDA with microphones binaurally mounted on a headset for quick recording.

=== Telecom and audio ===
Brüel & Kjær provides products to telecom and audio customers – from transducers to measurement, analysis and reporting for evaluation of electroacoustic devices:

- A dedicated platform that includes couplers, microphones, amplifiers, analyzers, calibrators, sound sources, and measurement and analysis software.
- Specialised standards-based telephone test systems for all communication technologies, including GSM, UMTS, AMPS, CDMA, W-CDMA, Bluetooth and VoIP.
- Exceptional ear and mouth simulators.
- Advanced material testing, modal analysis, sound quality and environmental procedures for development, benchmarking, production and quality assurance testing.

== Organisational developments ==
In 1992 Brüel & Kjær was sold to AGIV (a German holding company), and split into a number of separate companies:

- Brüel & Kjær Sound and Vibration Measurement A/S (the core sound and vibration market)
- Brüel & Kjær Vibro (machinery condition monitoring)
- B-K Medical (ultrasonic medical diagnostic instruments)
- Innova Air Tech Instruments A/S (gas analysis instrumentation)
- Danish Pro Audio, now DPA Microphones (studio microphones)

After the division of the company, a number of former employees left to form G.R.A.S. Sound and Vibration. AGIV included the Brüel & Kjær split companies within its Spectris Division, which comprised Brüel & Kjær, Hottinger Baldwin Messtechnik GmbH (HBM), and BTG Instruments GmbH. In July 2000, the Spectris Division was sold to the British company Fairey Group Ltd; in May 2001, Fairey Group changed its name to Spectris Plc.

Brüel & Kjær acquired LDS Test & Measurement in January 2009 and Lochard Ltd in February 2009.

On 1 August 2020, Brüel & Kjær merged with Hottinger Baldwin Messtechnik and changed its name to Hottinger Brüel & Kjær.

Parent company Spectris acquired Concurrent Real-Time, a real-time systems division of Battery Ventures created from the partial acquisition of Concurrent Computer Corporation, in April 2021 for $166.7 million. After the acquisition was complete, Concurrent Real-Time became a division of Brüel & Kjær in July 2021.

== See also ==
- Acoustical measurements and instrumentation
