= Particle velocity probe =

A particle velocity probe, also known as a particle velocity sensor, is a device used to measure acoustic particle velocity in a sound field. In contrast to standard microphones, which measure sound pressure, particle velocity probes detect the vector quantity of particle motion. This measurement can be used for spatial analysis of acoustic environments. Two models of this device are commercially available. One is manufactured by Microflown Technologies, which produces a transducer known as the Microflown. The other is produced by Weles Acoustics. Both devices utilize similar transduction principles to measure acoustic particle velocity.

The Microflown sensor is a microelectromechanical systems (MEMS) transducer designed to measure acoustic particle velocity directly. It is fabricated using cleanroom processes on silicon wafers. The sensor’s sensing element comprises two platinum wires, which function as temperature-dependent resistors. An electrical current heats these wires, and variations in local temperature cause changes in their electrical resistance. When exposed to an acoustic field, the particle velocity induces an asymmetric temperature distribution between the wires, resulting in a measurable resistance difference. This produces an output signal that is linearly related to the acoustic particle velocity over a frequency range typically between 20 Hz and 10 kHz. The sensor has a figure-eight directivity pattern.

Two particle velocity probes placed orthogonal to each other is used in the Acoustic Multi Mission Sensor (AMMS), a device for detecting the location of gunfire and explosions, where it provides a 2D bearing measurement. Three orthogonal probes such as used in the Acoustic Vector Sensor (AVS) can be used for 3D bearing measurement.

== Literature ==
Multiple application cases, theory and fundamentals of particle velocity sensing:

- The Microflown e-Book.

List of academic publications related to particle velocity sensors:

- General publication list of articles related to acoustic particle velocity.

To model a tri-axial particle velocity probe's measurement of a source incident from the near field, see:

- Y. I. Wu, K. T. Wong & S.-K. Lau, “The Acoustic Vector-Sensor’s Near-Field Array-Manifold,” IEEE Transactions on Signal Processing, vol. 58, no. 7, pp. 3946-3951, July 2010.

The tri-axial particle velocity probe's azimuth-elevation beam pattern:

- K. T. Wong & H. Chi, “Beam Patterns of an Underwater Acoustic Vector Hydrophone Located Away from any Reflecting Boundary,” IEEE Journal of Oceanic Engineering, vol. 27, no. 3, pp. 628-637, July 2002.

A tri-axial particle velocity probe may be used to enhance speech reception in a video conferencing scenario:

- Y. Wu, K. T. Wong, S.-K. Lau, X. Yuan & S. K. Tang, “A Directionally Tunable but Frequency-Invariant Beamformer on an Acoustic Velocity-Sensor Triad to Enhance Speech Perception,” Journal of the Acoustical Society of America, vol. 131, no. 5, pp. 3891-3902, May 2012.
