= IPMX =

Interoperable video and audio networking

IPMX (Internet Protocol Media Experience) is a suite of open standards and specifications that provide an interoperable way to transport compressed and uncompressed video, audio, and related metadata over data networks within a multi-vendor IP audiovisual system. IPMX is based on the SMPTE 2110 and AES67 suite of standards, the related AMWA Networked Media Open Specifications (NMOS) and Video Services Forum's (VSF) Technical Recommendations (TR-10) which add specific capabilities for Pro AV (professional audio visual) workflows.

IPMX is designed to transport and control media, including 4Kp60 video with 4:4:4 color, over standard Ethernet networks, with very low latency. IPMX, similar to other AV over IP (Audio Visual over Internet Protocol) standards and technologies, supports applications of high-performance media signals over packetized IP Networks instead of using traditional point-to-point cables such as HDMI, DisplayPort, and SDI. IPMX can be used in professional media environments such as broadcasting, live events, corporate communications, event space Pro AV, and educational facilities.

IPMX supports SD (standard definition) resolutions, Full HD, 4K Ultra HD and is ready for 8K resolutions and beyond. Additional capabilities beyond ST 2110 include HDMI InfoFrame packet transport, NMOS discovery and registration, I/O management, compressed media using the JPEG XS video coding system as well as new key exchange protocols for handing encrypted content between different products from different providers. IPMX can be used on a network with synchronous sources locked with Precision Time Protocol (PTP) or with asynchronous sources.

== History ==
In 2019 the Alliance for IP Media Solutions (AIMS) launched the IPMX roadmap. In 2022 and 2023, products from many manufacturers were showing IPMX working in live production and presentation workflows, and were also interoperating with synchronized SMPTE ST 2110 systems. In February 2024, the VSF's TR-10 was ratified. In January 2026 the European Broadcasting Union held an IPMX tested Event in Geneva where products were officially certified. These products were added to an online registry.

== TR-10 Specifications ==
The TR-10 specifications for Pro AV workflows are the following:

- TR-10-0: 2024 Internet Protocol Media Experience (IPMX): General Organization
- TR-10-1: 2024 Internet Protocol Media Experience (IPMX): System Timing and Definitions
- TR-10-2: 2024 Internet Protocol Media Experience (IPMX): Uncompressed Active Video
- TR-10-3: 2024 Internet Protocol Media Experience (IPMX): PCM Digital Audio
- TR-10-4: 2023 Internet Protocol Media Experience (IPMX): SMPTE ST 291-1 Ancillary Data (DRAFT)
- TR-10-5: 2024 Internet Protocol Media Experience (IPMX): HDCP Key Exchange Protocol
- TR-10-6: 2022 Internet Protocol Media Experience (IPMX): Forward Error Correction (FEC) (DRAFT)
- TR-10-7:2022 Internet Protocol Media Experience (IPMX): Compressed Video (DRAFT)
- TR-10-8: 2024 Internet Protocol Media Experience (IPMX): NMOS Requirements
- TR-10-9: 2025: Internet Protocol Media Experience (IPMX): Requirements for System Environments and Device Behavior – (DRAFT)
- TR-10-10: Internet Protocol Media Experience (IPMX): HDMI InfoFrame Packet Transport (DRAFT)
- TR-10-11: 2024 Internet Protocol Media Experience (IPMX): Constant Bit-Rate Compressed Video
- TR-10-12: 2023-2 Internet Protocol Media Experience (IPMX): AES3 Transparent Transport (DRAFT)
- TR-10-13: 2024 Internet Protocol Media Experience (IPMX): Privacy Encryption Protocol (PEP)
- TR-10-14: 2024 Internet Protocol Media Experience (IPMX): IPMX USB (DRAFT)
- TR-10-15 Part 1: 2025 Internet Protocol Media Experience (IPMX): JPEG-XS Codec Requirements for Compressed Video – DRAFT
- TR-10-15 Part 2: 2026 Internet Protocol Media Experience (IPMX): H.265 Codec Requirements for Compressed Video – DRAFT
- TR-10-15 Part 3: 2026 Internet Protocol Media Experience (IPMX) H.264 Codec Requirements for Compressed Video – DRAFT
- TR-10-16: 2025 Internet Protocol Media Experience (IPMX): HDR Info Block – DRAFT
