= Comparison of audio network protocols =

The following is a comparison of audio over Ethernet and audio over IP audio network protocols and systems.

Audio network technology matrix
Technology	Development date	Transport	Transmission scheme	Mixed use networking	Control communications	Topology	Fault tolerance	Distance	Diameter	Network capacity	Latency	Maximum available sampling rate
AES47	2002	ATM	Isochronous	Coexists with ATM	Any IP or ATM protocol, IEC 62379	Mesh	Provided by ATM	Cat5=100 m, MM=2 km, SM=70 km	Unlimited	Unlimited	125 μs per hop	192 kHz
AES50		Ethernet physical layer (Note: Ethernet transport is combined with a proprietary audio clock transport. AES50 and HyperMAC are point-to-point audio connections, but they bridge a limited bandwidth of regular Ethernet for the purpose of control communications. An AES50/HyperMAC router contains a crosspoint matrix (or similar) for audio routing, and an Ethernet switch for control routing. The system topology may therefore follow any valid Ethernet topology, but the audio routers need a priori knowledge of the topology. While there are no limits to the number of AES50 routing devices that can be interconnected, each hop adds another link's worth of latency, and each router device needs to be controlled individually.)	Isochronous or synchronous	dedicated Cat5	5 Mbit/s Ethernet	Point-to-point	FEC, redundant link	Cat5=100 m	Unlimited	48 channels	63 μs	384 kHz and DSD
AES67	2013-09	Any IP medium	Isochronous	Coexists with other traffic using DiffServ QoS	IP, SIP	Any L2 or IP network	Provided by IP	Medium dependent	Unlimited	Unlimited	4, 1, 1/3, 1/4 and 1/8 ms packet times (Note: AES67 devices are required to implement the 1 ms packet time. Minimum theoretical latency is two times packet time. Typical implementations achieve latencies of three times the packet time.)	96 kHz
AudioRail (Note: Technology retired February 2014)		Ethernet physical layer	Synchronous	Cat5 or fiber	Proprietary	Daisy chain	None	Cat5=100 m, MM=2 km, SM=70 km	Unlimited	32 channels	4.5 μs + 0.25 μs per hop	48 kHz (32 channels), 96 kHz (16 channels)
AVB (using IEEE 1722 transport)	2011-09	Enhanced Ethernet	Isochronous	Coexists with other traffic using IEEE 802.1p QoS and admission control	IEEE 1722.1	Spanning tree	Provided by IEEE 802.1	Cat5=100 m, MM=2 km, SM=70 km	Dependent on latency class and network speed	Dependent on latency class and network speed	2 ms or less	192 kHz
Aviom Pro64		Ethernet physical layer	Synchronous	Dedicated Cat5 and fiber	Proprietary	Daisy chain (bidirectional)	Redundant links	Cat5e=120 m, MM=2 km, SM=70 km	9520 km (Note: The network diameter figure is the largest conceivable network using fiber and 138 Pro64 merger units; derived from maximum allowed response time between control master and furthest slave device.)	64 channels	322 μs + 1.34 μs per hop	208 kHz (Note: Pro64 supports a wide variation range from the nominal sample rate values (e.g., 158.8 kHz - 208 kHz).)
CobraNet	1996	Ethernet data link layer	Isochronous	coexists with Ethernet	Ethernet, SNMP, MIDI	Spanning tree	Provided by IEEE 802.1 (Note: Network redundancy is provided by 802.1 Ethernet: STP, Link aggregation; redundant network connections (DualLink) and redundant devices (BuddyLink) are supported.)	Cat5=100 m, MM=2 km, SM=70 km	7 hops, 10 km (Note: Indicated diameter is for 5 1/3 ms latency mode. CobraNet has more stringent design rules for its lower latency modes. Requirements are documented in terms of maximum delay and delay variation. A downloadable CAD tool can be used to validate a network design for a given operating mode.)	Unlimited	1 1/3, 2 2/3 and 5 1/3 ms	96 kHz
Dante	2006	Any IP medium	Isochronous	Coexists with other traffic using DiffServ QoS	Proprietary Control Protocol based on IP, Bonjour	Any L2 or single IP subnet	Provided by IEEE 802.1 and redundant link	Cat5=100 m, MM=2 km, SM=70 km	Dependent on latency	Unlimited	84 μs or greater (Note: The 84 μs latency value is based on 4 audio samples with this configuration. Note that latency is dependent on topology and bandwidth constraints of the underlying hardware, for example, 800 μs on a 100 Mbit/s Dolby Lake Processor.)	192 kHz
EtherSound ES-100	2001	Ethernet data link layer	Isochronous	Dedicated Ethernet	Proprietary	Star, daisy chain, ring	Fault tolerant ring	Cat5=140 m, MM=2 km, SM=70 km	Unlimited	64 (Note: EtherSound allows channels to be dropped and added at each node along the daisy-chain or ring. Although the number of channels between any two locations is limited to 64, depending on routing requirements, the total number of channels on the network may be significantly higher.)	84–125 μs + 1.4 μs/node	96 kHz
EtherSound ES-Giga		Ethernet data-link layer	Isochronous	Coexists with Ethernet	Proprietary	Star, Daisy chain, ring	Fault tolerant ring	Cat5=140 m, MM=600 m, SM=70 km	Unlimited	512 (Note: EtherSound allows channels to be dropped and added at each node along the daisy-chain or ring. Although the number of channels between any two locations is limited to 512, depending on routing requirements, the total number of channels on the network may be significantly higher.)	84–125 μs + 0.5 μs/node	96 kHz
Gibson MaGIC	1999-09-18	Ethernet data-link layer	Isochronous		Proprietary, MIDI	Star, Daisy chain		Cat5=100 m	32 channels		290 μs or less	192 kHz
HyperMAC		Gigabit Ethernet	Isochronous	Dedicated Cat5, Cat6, or fiber	100 Mbit/s+ Ethernet	Point-to-point	Redundant link	Cat6=100 m, MM=500 m, SM=10 km	Unlimited	384+ channels	63 μs	384 kHz and DSD
Livewire	2003	Any IP medium	Isochronous	Coexists with Ethernet	Ethernet, HTTP, XML	Any L2 or IP network	Provided by IEEE 802.1 (Note: Network redundancy is provided by 802.1 Ethernet: STP, Link aggregation.)	Cat5=100 m, MM=2 km, SM=70 km	Unlimited	32760 channels	0.75 ms	48 kHz
Milan	2018	Ethernet	Isochronous	Coexist with other protocols in converged networks	IEEE 1722.1	Star, Daisy chain	Redundant links	Cat5=100 m, MM=2 km, SM=70 km	Dependent on latency class and network speed	Unlimited	2 ms or less	192 kHz
mLAN	2000-01	IEEE 1394	Isochronous	Coexists with IEEE 1394	IEEE 1394, MIDI	Tree	Provided by IEEE 1394b	IEEE 1394 cable (2 power, 4 signal): 4.5 m	100 m	63 devices (800 Mbit/s)	354.17 μs	192 kHz (Note: Many mLAN devices have a maximum sampling rate of 96 kHz, but this is a constraint of the stream extraction chips used rather than the core mLAN technology.)
Optocore (Note: These entries refer to the classic fiber-based Optocore system; no information has yet been obtained regarding the Cat5e version. Confirmation is being sought for the figure of 110 km max distance.)		Dedicated fiber	Synchronous	Dedicated Cat5/fiber	Proprietary	Ring	Redundant ring	MM=700 m, SM=110 km	Unlimited	1008 channels at 48 kHz	41.6 μs	96 kHz
Q-LAN	2009	IP over Gigabit Ethernet	Isochronous	Coexists with other traffic using DiffServ QoS	IP, HTTP, XML	Any L2 or IP network	IEEE 802.1, redundant link, IP routing	Cat5=100 m, MM=550 m, SM=10 km	7 hops or 35 km	Unlimited	1 ms	48 kHz
RAVENNA	2010	Any IP medium	Isochronous	Coexists with other traffic using DiffServ QoS	IP, RTSP, Bonjour	Any L2 or IP network	Provided by IP and redundant link	Medium dependent	Unlimited	Unlimited	variable (Note: Latency depends on frame size (packet time), network topology and chosen link offset, with. min. frame size = 1 sample.)	384 kHz and DSD
Riedel Rocknet		Ethernet physical layer	Isochronous	Dedicated Cat5/fiber	Proprietary	Ring	Redundant ring	Cat5e=150 m, MM=2 km, SM=20 km	10 km max, 99 devices	160 channels (48 kHz/24-bit)	400 μs at 48 kHz	96 kHz
SoundGrid		Ethernet data link layer	Isochronous	Dedicated Ethernet	Proprietary	Star, daisy chain	Device redundancy	Cat5/Cat5e/Cat6/Cat7 =100m, MM=2km, SM=70km	3 hops	Unlimited	166 μs or greater	96kHz
Symetrix SymLink		Ethernet physical layer	Synchronous	Dedicated Ethernet	Proprietary	Ring	None	Cat5=10 m	16 devices	64 channels	83 μs per hop	48 kHz
UMAN		IEEE 1394 and Ethernet AVB (Note: Transport is listed for media streaming and control. Ethernet is also for control.)	Isochronous and asynchronous	Coexists with Ethernet	IP-based XFN	Daisy chain in ring, tree, or star (with hubs)	fault tolerant ring, device redundancy	Cat5e=50 m, Cat6=75 m, MM=1 km, SM=>2 km	Unlimited	400 channels (48 kHz/24 bit) (Note: UMAN also supports up to 25 channels of H.264 video.)	354 μs + 125 μs per hop (Note: Base latency measurement is provided for up to 16 daisy-chained devices.)	192 kHz
