= Audio networking =

Live distribution of digital audio across an Ethernet network

In audio and broadcast engineering, Audio networking is the use of a network to distribute real-time digital audio. Audio Networking replaces bulky snake cables or audio-specific installed low-voltage wiring with standard network structured cabling in a facility. Audio Networking provides a reliable backbone for any audio application, such as for large-scale sound reinforcement in stadiums, airports and convention centers, multiple studios or stages.

While Audio Networking bears a resemblance to voice over IP (VoIP) and audio contribution over IP (ACIP), Audio Networking is intended for high-fidelity, low-latency professional audio. Because of the fidelity and latency constraints, Audio Networking systems generally do not utilize audio data compression. Audio Networking systems use a much higher bit rate (typically 1 Mbit/s per channel) and much lower latency (typically less than 10 milliseconds) than VoIP. Audio Networking requires a high-performance network. Performance requirements may be met through use of a dedicated local area network (LAN) or virtual LAN (VLAN), overprovisioning or quality of service features.

Some Audio Networking systems use proprietary protocols (at the lower OSI layers) which create Ethernet frames that are transmitted directly onto the Ethernet (layer 2) for efficiency and reduced overhead. The word clock may be provided by broadcast packets.

== Protocols ==
There are several different and incompatible protocols for Audio Networking. Protocols can be broadly categorized into layer-1, layer-2 and layer-3 systems based on the layer in the OSI model where the protocol exists.

=== Layer-1 protocols ===
Layer-1 protocols use Ethernet wiring and signaling components but do not use the Ethernet frame structure. Layer-1 protocols often use their own media access control (MAC) rather than the one native to Ethernet, which generally creates compatibility issues and thus requires a dedicated network for the protocol.

==== Open standards ====
- AES50 (SuperMAC) by Klark Teknik, a point-to-point interconnect for bidirectional digital audio and sync clock
- MaGIC by Gibson

==== Proprietary ====
- HyperMAC, a gigabit Ethernet variant of SuperMAC
- A-Net by Aviom
- AudioRail
- ULTRANET By Behringer

=== Layer-2 protocols ===
Layer-2 protocols encapsulate audio data in standard Ethernet frames. This is called Audio over Ethernet. Most protocols make use of standard Ethernet hubs and switches, though some require that the network (or at least a VLAN) be dedicated to the audio distribution application.

==== Open standards ====
- AES51, a method of passing ATM services over Ethernet that allows AES3 audio to be carried in a similar way to AES47
- Audio Video Bridging (AVB), when used with the IEEE 1722 AV Transport Protocol profile (which transports IEEE 1394/IEC 61883 (FireWire) over Ethernet frames, using IEEE 802.1AS for timing)

==== Proprietary ====
- CobraNet
  - RAVE by QSC Audio, an implementation of CobraNet
- EtherSound by Digigram
  - NetCIRA, a rebranded EtherSound by Fostex
- REAC and RSS digital snake technology by Roland
- SoundGrid by Waves Audio
- dSNAKE by Allen & Heath

=== Layer-3 protocols ===
Layer-3 protocols encapsulate audio data in OSI model layer 3 (network layer) packets. By definition it does not limit the choice of protocol to be the most popular layer-3 protocol, the Internet Protocol (IP). In some implementations, the layer-3 audio data packets are further packaged inside OSI model layer-4 (transport layer) packets, most commonly User Datagram Protocol (UDP) or Real-time Transport Protocol (RTP). Use of UDP or RTP to carry audio data enables them to be distributed through standard computer routers, thus a large distribution audio network can be built economically using commercial off-the-shelf equipment.

Although IP packets can traverse the Internet, most layer-3 protocols cannot provide reliable transmission over the Internet due to the limited bandwidth, significant End-to-end delay and packet loss that can be encountered by data flow over the Internet. For similar reasons, transmission of layer-3 audio over wireless LAN are also not supported by most implementations.

==== Open standards ====
- AES67
- Audio Contribution over IP standardized by the European Broadcasting Union
- Audio Video Bridging (AVB), when used with IEEE 1733 or AES67 (which uses standard RTP over UDP/IP, with extensions for linking IEEE 802.1AS Precision Time Protocol timing information to payload data)
- NetJack, a network backend for the JACK Audio Connection Kit
- Zita-njbridge, a set of clients for the JACK Audio Connection Kit
- RAVENNA by ALC NetworX (uses PTPv2 timing)

==== Proprietary ====
- Livewire by Axia Audio, a division of Telos Systems
- Dante by Audinate (PTP version 1 timing)
- Q-LAN by QSC Audio Products (PTP version 2 timing)
- WheatNet-IP by Wheatstone Corporation

== Similar concepts ==
High quality digital audio distribution was patented in 1988 by Tareq Hoque at the MIT Media Lab. The technology was licensed to several leading OEM audio and chip manufacturers that were further developed into commercial products.

RockNet by Riedel Communications, uses Cat-5 cabling. Hydra2 by Calrec uses Cat-5e cabling or fiber through SFP transceivers.

MADI uses 75-ohm coaxial cable with BNC connectors or optical fibre to carry up to 64 channels of digital audio in a point-to-point connection. It is most similar in design to AES3, which can carry only two channels.

AES47 provides audio networking by passing AES3 audio transport over an ATM network using structured network cabling (both copper and fibre). This was used extensively by contractors supplying the BBC's wide area real-time audio connectivity around the UK.

Audio Contribution over IP differs in that it works at a higher layer, encapsulated within Internet Protocol. Some of these systems are usable on the Internet, but may not be as instantaneous, and are only as reliable as the network route — such as the path from a remote broadcast back to the main studio, or the studio/transmitter link (STL), the most critical part of the airchain. This is similar to VoIP, however ACIP is comparable to AoIP for a small number of channels, which are usually also data-compressed. Reliability for permanent STL uses comes from the use of a virtual circuit, usually on a leased line such as T1/E1, or at minimum ISDN or DSL.

In broadcasting, and to some extent in studio and even live production, many manufacturers equip their own audio engines to be tied together. This may also be done with gigabit Ethernet and optical fibre rather than wire. This allows each studio to have its own engine, or for auxiliary studios to share an engine. By connecting them together, different sources can be shared among them.

Audio Networking is not necessarily intended for wireless networks, thus the use of various 802.11 devices may or may not work with various (or any) Audio Networking protocols.

== See also ==
- Comparison of audio network protocols
- Ethernet Powerlink
- HDBaseT
- Audio over IP
