= Ravenna (networking) =

Real-time professional audio over IP networking

RAVENNA

Manufacturer info
- Manufacturer: ALC NetworX (a Lawo company)
- Development date: 2010; 15 years ago

Network compatibility
- Switchable: Yes
- Routable: Yes
- Ethernet data rates: Gigabit Ethernet

Audio specifications
- Maximum sampling rate: 192 kHz (PCM), 384 kHz (DSD or DXD)
- Maximum bit depth: 24-bit

Ravenna is a technology for real-time transport of audio and other media data over IP networks. Ravenna was introduced on September 10, 2010 at the International Broadcasting Convention in Amsterdam.

Ravenna can operate on most existing network infrastructures using standard networking technology. Performance and capacity scale with network performance. Ravenna is designed to match broadcasters' requirements for low latency, full signal transparency and high reliability.

Fields of application include in-house signal distribution for broadcasting houses and other fixed installations, flexible setups at venues and live events, outside broadcasting support, and inter-studio links across wide area network links and production facilities.

== Standard protocols ==
Ravenna is an IP-based solution. As such, it is based on protocol levels at or above layer 3 of the OSI reference model. All protocols and mechanisms used within Ravenna are based on widely deployed and established standards:

- Streaming is based on the well-established RTP / RTCP protocols with payload formats defined by various RFCs (i.e., RFC 3550, RFC 3551 et al.).
- Both unicast and multicast are supported on a per-stream basis.
- Stream management and connection is achieved through SDP or RTSP protocol.
- QoS is based on DiffServ mechanism
- Device configuration and discovery is executed through the use of DHCP and DNS services or zeroconf mechanisms.
- Low-level device configuration is accomplished through independent web services via HTTP protocol.
- Time synchronization is maintained via PTPv2 (IEEE 1588-2008).
- Stream redundancy is based on SMPTE ST 2022-7 standard.

== Open technology ==
Ravenna is an open-technology standard without a proprietary licensing policy. A first-draft version of the Ravenna specification is publicly available. The development is jointly executed within the RAVENNA Partner Group under the leadership of ALC NetworX GmbH, Munich. Current Ravenna partners include:

- 2wcom (Germany)
- AEQ (Spain)
- AETA (France)
- Archwave (Switzerland)
- AVT Audio Video Technologies GmbH (Germany)
- Calrec (UK)
- Digigram (France)
- DirectOut (Germany)
- Dolby (USA)
- Genelec (Finland)
- Infomedia (China)
- Lawo (Germany)
- Merging Technologies (Switzerland)
- Neumann (Germany)
- Orban (USA)
- Qbit (Germany)
- Riedel Communications (Germany)
- Ross Video (Canada)
- Schoeps (Germany)
- SciSys (Germany)
- Sonifex (UK)
- Sound4 (France)
- The Telos Alliance (USA)
- WorldCast Systems (France)
- and others

== Standardization activities ==
Ravenna contributed to the AES67 standardization efforts. Ravenna is compatible with AES67 and all relevant mechanisms, protocols and formats used for synchronization, transport and payload mandated by AES67 are fully supported.

Ravenna contributed to the SMPTE 2110 standardization efforts. (Note: SMPTE ST 2110-31 - AES3 Transparent Transport was drafted based on Ravenna's AM824 - RTP payload format for AES3.) Ravenna is compatible with the audio parts SMPTE ST 2110-30 and -31.

== Awards ==
Ravenna was a recipient of a Technology & Engineering Emmy Award in 2020 for Development of Synchronized multi-channel uncompressed audio transport over IP Network.
