= WSOE =

Coordinates: 36.1071°N 79.5059°W

- Elon, North Carolina; United States
- Broadcast area: Burlington, NC
- Frequency: 89.3 MHz

Programming
- Format: Alternative

Ownership
- Owner: Elon University

History
- First air date: 1977
- Call sign meaning: Wonderful Sounds Of Elon

Technical information
- Licensing authority: FCC

Links
- Public license information: Public file; LMS
- Website: WSOE

WSOE is a non-commercial student-run college radio station based at Elon University in Elon, North Carolina, that broadcasts at 89.3fm. The station serves as a creative outlet for students and as a means for students to develop skills for professional broadcast careers. WSOE offers a variety of opportunities in music shows, sports broadcasting, artist interviews, and music technology. The station aims to promote local artists through ticket giveaways, interviews, and playing these musicians' music over the air.

== History ==
The initial organizational effort to launch a brand-new campus radio station occurred in 1971 guided by student Phil Hawkins. Trepidations expressed by then President of Elon, Dr. J. Earl Danieley, fearing "what the students will say" resulted in the proposal being shelved. It was not until J. Fred Young became president in 1973 that serious fund-raising was started and FCC applications were submitted. WSOE first received their charter from the Federal Communications Commission in 1977.

WSOE first broadcast on September 29, 1977, with the first full broadcast on October 6, 1977. WSOE's first broadcast was “More Than a Feeling” by Boston, as chosen by then station manager, Bill Zint.

The call letters "WSOE" were originally held by the Milwaukee School of Engineering, but were acquired by the new Elon radio station when their charter was granted. WSOE was the 21st attempt to gain call letter approval from the licensing department of the Federal Communications Commission. The callsign is now used as an abbreviation for "the Wonderful Sounds of Elon". Since then, the station has broadcast to the Elon/Burlington area under the management of students and a faculty mentor. In 2000, WSOE became a member of College Broadcasters, Inc., being one of the first stations to do so.

In the fall of 2005, the station began broadcasting live coverage of Elon University soccer and volleyball games. As of spring 2020, the station broadcasts the majority of Elon Phoenix Women's Basketball games.

During the spring of 2009, the station started its webcast, expanding its range to anyone with an internet connection. As of 2012, the webcast has been available on TuneIn through both their website and mobile apps. WSOE has reported charts to CMJ on and off over the course of its history and has been consistently reporting since early 2013.

The original WSOE studio, newsroom, office, and production room was located across from Harden Dining Hall. The entire station was moved (with the exception of the transmitter and radio tower) over the winter of 1994 into the then newly opened Moseley Center.

WSOE will be moved into the McEwen School of Communications after the construction of its addition, which is planned to be underway in early 2016. The station's transmitter was originally located on the south side of Harden Dining Hall, but after the building's demolition in May 2012, a temporary radio tower was placed on the Moseley Center. The station now broadcasts from a newer cell tower, located just off-campus.

In early 2017, WSOE moved studios from the Moseley Student Center into the basement of the newly renovated McEwen Communications School. The station briefly ceased operations during the move. The new station included Wheatstone equipment, audio over Ethernet, a new studio, a mixing room, and a new scheduling system.

In 2018, WSOE launched its podcasting program, allowing students to create and launch their own podcasts through all major distribution services. The program was created by Joseph Henry-Penrose, Patrick Larsen, and Annie Kalinowski, launching with 5 podcasts.

== Format ==
WSOE is a freeform station. DJs may play whatever legal content they wish during their allotted time. From 10pm to 6am, WSOE broadcasts a late night rotation when DJs are not available. This late night rotation includes jazz, electronic, experimental, rap, hip-hop, and local music from North Carolina and the Triangle.

WSOE has an automated broadcast system using RCS software that schedules all content, allowing the station to broadcast uninterrupted.

== Sports coverage ==
WSOE Sports provides exclusive coverage of Elon University women's basketball. All broadcasts include pre- and post-game interviews and coverage. The station also features many weekly sports talk shows, covering a range of professional and collegiate sports.

== News ==
Elon News Network (ENN) (then Elon Local News) had a weekly news radio show on WSOE called "ELN on WSOE" which has been run by four executive producers in years past: Ryan Green, Brian Mezerski, Mack White Ilana Spiegel and Sarah Collins The Pendulum, Elon's campus newspaper, previously partnered with WSOE as a way to supplement their presentation of news in print with a radio news broadcast

As of 2016, WSOE no longer partners with ENN or The Pendulum, allowing students to own their own news programming.

In February 2020, WSOE and ENN joined to broadcast coverage of the Alamance County Commissioners forum.

== Management ==
WSOE is run by a board of several executive staff members, a student general manager, and one faculty advisor, not including the approximately 130 DJs who host one- or two-hour shows. All aspects of the station are run by the student executive staff, including bills, music, and most production. The number of executive staff members and the position they occupy have varied over time, but the station has always had a general manager, music director, and program director. WSOE is overseen by the Elon University Media Board, which oversees all student media at Elon including The Pendulum (newspaper), the television station ESTV, the yearbook Phi Psi Cli, the literary magazine Colonnades, and Limelight Records; many of which work closely with WSOE.

WSOE was first managed by Gerald Gibson. Bryan baker took over, leading the station for many years. In 2020, Abby Igoe took over as Faculty Advisor.

List of Previous General Managers (In Progress)
Name	Tenure
Brian Koral	1999-2000
Jessica Vitak	2001
Chris Gaylor	2002
Phil Elkins	2003
Travis Lusk	2004
Michelle Tufts	2005-2006
Nikki Wasikowski	2007
Erin Fox	2008
Ryan Sweeney	2009
Sierra Ferrier	2011-2012
Mack White	2014-2015
Matt Sears	2016
Katherine Wolter	2017
Thomas Coogan	2018
Joseph Henry-Penrose	2019
Mabel Kitchens	2020
Ahron Frankel	2024
Sarah Jackson	2025

== Community engagement ==
WSOE partners with local musicians and labels for live studio sessions. WSOE has also partnered with several festivals, providing coverage of Moogfest, Hopscotch Music Festival, Hangout Music Festival, Merlefest Music Festival, and others.

WSOE has held several fundraises for the Burlington Boys & Girls club over the years. The station previously held an annual "Jingle Bell Rock," with the Burlington YMCA and Bynum Youth Center. The event had student DJs leading activities including card making, ornament decorating, book readings, and a visit from Santa. DJs also organized a toy drive, providing gifts to 65 families in the Burlington Boys & Girls Club. A poker tournament was held on WSOE in 2005, raising $123 for the Burlington Boys & Girls Club.

In 2008, WSOE launched a record label with the goals of promoting local musicians, fund raising for the Alamance-Burlington School System’s arts program, and to give Elon University students experience working with all aspects of music production.

In 2019, WSOE held an interactive program for seven students from the Walter M. Williams High School in Burlington, NC.

== See also ==
- College radio
- Podcast
