= Conemtech =

Swedish fabless semiconductor company

- Industry: Semiconductor
- Founded: 2009
- Headquarters: Kista, Sweden

Conemtech is a Swedish fabless semiconductor company created in 2009 by a management buy out of selected assets of the Swedish company, Imsys AB. (Imsys AB was founded in 1992). The name, Conemtech, is a blend of the words "Connected embedded technology". Conemtech's first major order was announced on January 31, 2011, for use in mobile phone network base stations for a major Chinese carrier. A much larger second order to the same client was announced in February 2013.

== Products ==
Focusing on the IEEE 1588 standard, Conemtech offered products such as the M50 and P50 Modules, allowing Ethernet interfaces to synchronize themselves to a clock within the network, which could be installed into already existing systems.

The IEEE 1588 Ver. 2 precision time protocol standard specifies a method of time synchronization and frequency control of electronic system elements generally interconnected by wired or optical Ethernet. The standard is currently being actively updated and is also being used as the basis for new wireless types of precision time control. Primary current applications include base station synchronization for mobile telecom systems, including advanced 3G and most new LTE base stations; smart grid power distribution systems; financial trading networks; and any network needing precise distributed timing information.
