= AMWA =

AMWA may refer to:

- Advanced Media Workflow Association
- Akina Mama wa Afrika
- American Medical Women's Association
- American Medical Writers Association
- Association of Metropolitan Water Agencies
