= Networked Media Open Specifications =

Media device control specifications

Networked Media Open Specifications (NMOS) are a group of open-source specifications intended to allow interoperability on the control layer for media devices on an Internet Protocol (IP) infrastructure. NMOS provides discovery, registration and control services for the SMPTE ST 2110 media over IP networks, and other media over IP applications.

== History ==
The NMOS specifications were created by the Advanced Media Workflow Association (AMWA), and are made available under the Apache-2.0 Licence.

The first NMOS specification (IS-04 v1.0.0) was published by AMWA in April 2016. There have been 15 total published releases of the IS-04 NMOS Discovery and Registration Specification, the most recent being v1.3.3 in December 2024.

The NMOS Connection Management API (IS-05) was released in October 2017. There have been 6 total published releases of IS-05, the most recent being v1.2.2 in October 2022.

== Interface specifications ==
NMOS Interface Specifications (IS) specify HTTP APIs to support interoperability between systems. There are currently two Interface Specifications deemed critical for the success of ST 2110:

- IS-04 - Discovery and Registration – IS-04 helps devices find each other and announce their capabilities.
- IS-05 - Connection Management – IS-05 allows the configuration of connections between devices called Senders and Receivers.

There are several other published NMOS Interface Specifications:

- IS-07 - Event and Tally
- IS-08 - Audio Channel Mapping
- IS-09 - Systems Parameters
- IS-10 - Authorization
- IS-11 - Stream Compatibility Management
- IS-12 - Control Protocol
- IS-14 - Device Configuration

(IS-06 - Network Control - is deprecated as of September 2022.)

== Other specifications ==
As well as Interface Specifications, AMWA publishes Data Specifications, Best Current Practice and Informative Documents to support NMOS.

== Work in Progress ==
The AMWA develops NMOS Specifications in Working Groups that are authorized by the AMWA Board. The Working Groups operate within a specific scope. Work product under development is called Work in Progress. Work in Progress is publicly visible very early in the process.

== Recognition & reception ==
NMOS specifications have been endorsed by several industry organizations, including the European Broadcasting Union, which published a position statement in 2019 urging the accelerated adoption of NMOS. The Joint Task Force on Networked Media (JT-NM) have endorsed NMOS as a key enabling technology for SMPTE ST 2110 environments. Leaders from technology companies like Sony and Nextera Video have spoken on record about their support of NMOS.

In 2026, the development of NMOS Discovery, Registration and Connection was recognised with a Technology & Engineering Emmy Award.

== See also ==
- Advanced Media Workflow Association
