= Linear Acoustic =

American company

- Company type: Private
- Industry: Broadcasting
- Founded: 2002
- Founder: Tim Carroll
- Headquarters: Lancaster, Pennsylvania, United States
- Products: Loudness controllers, loudness monitors and meters, DTV audio encoders and transcoders
- Website: www.linearacoustic.com

Linear Acoustic is an American company based in Lancaster, Pennsylvania that develops technology and manufacturers equipment used by television stations, cable television and satellite television services providers, post-production facilities and other content services providers to control, measure, manage and monitor multi-channel digital audio. The company has been especially active in areas related to automated upmixing and downmixing of multichannel broadcast audio, and with issues related to relative loudness of broadcast audio.

The company was founded in 2002 by Tim Carroll, who had previously worked as Product Manager for the Professional Audio Division of Dolby Laboratories in San Francisco. While at Dolby, Carroll contributed to the development of Dolby Digital (AC-3) and Dolby E encoding systems for DVD and high-definition television (HDTV) applications. Christina Carroll is the Vice President and Executive Director of Linear Acoustic and is responsible for managing day-to-day company operations.

The company’s products can be broadly broken down into three categories: Loudness controllers designed to help television broadcasters maintain consistent audio levels; monitors and meters that measure digital audio levels, including loudness; and stand-alone encoding and transcoding products for handling the various data compression technologies commonly found in digital television plants.

The subject of controlling loudness in television broadcasts has garnered considerable publicity since the FCC moved to implement enforcement of the Commercial Advertisement Loudness Mitigation or CALM Act on December 13, 2012. While consumer complaints about overly loud television commercials are almost as old as the medium itself, the CALM Act began as legislation was first sponsored by Representative Anna Eshoo, a Democratic congresswoman in California, in 2008. The law was passed in 2010 and went into full effect in 2011 and 2012.

The Linear Acoustic AERO line of audio processors effectively measures and manages shifts in loudness and controls discrepancies between program and commercial audio without unnecessarily degrading the quality of the audio or significantly affecting the dynamic range that adds impact to digital television audio. When used in combination with a meter capable of measuring loudness by the ITU-R BS.1770 standard (or derivatives of this standard, such as EBU R128) U.S. broadcasters will be able to achieve CALM compliance by effectively managing and monitoring audio levels.

Linear Acoustic also manufacturers the UPMAX 5.1-channel upmixer, which creates multi-channel surround sound audio from 2-channel (stereo) sources. NBC utilized this product during the 2008 Beijing Summer Olympics, and relied upon the company’s AERO.qc products during the 2010 Vancouver Winter Olympics.

In 2008, Linear Acoustic became part of The Telos Alliance, based in Cleveland, Ohio. The Telos Alliance comprises Telos Systems, Axia Audio, Omnia Audio, and 25-Seven Systems that manufacture broadcast telephone systems, consoles and audio over IP gear, audio processors, and audio time management hardware for radio stations. Frank Foti, founder of Omnia Audio, is The Telos Alliance CEO.

At the 2012 NAB Show in Las Vegas, Linear Acoustic announced a co-branding agreement with Dolby Laboratories under which the company will manufacture stand-alone Dolby-centric professional products such as audio codecs and audio bitstream test tools.

== Awards ==
In 2011, Linear Acoustic received a Technical Emmy for The Pioneering Development of an Audio/Metadata Processor for Conforming Audio to the ATSC Standard.
