= SMPTE 2059 =

SMPTE standard for video equipment synchronisation

SMPTE 2059 is a standard from the Society of Motion Picture and Television Engineers (SMPTE) that describes how to synchronize video equipment over an IP network. The standard is based on IEEE 1588-2008. SMPTE 2059 is published in two parts on 9 April 2015:

- SMPTE 2059-1 – Defines signal generation based on time information delivered by the IEEE 1588 protocol.
- SMPTE 2059-2 – Defines an operating profile for the IEEE protocol optimized to the needs of media synchronization.

SMPTE 2059 is an integral part of emerging professional IP video broadcast technology and standards.

In May 2016, the Audio Engineering Society published a report describing synchronization interoperability between AES67 and SMPTE 2059-2.

== Operating parameters ==
SMPTE 2059 PTP profile parameters
Parameter	Default	Minimum	Maximum
Domain number	127	0	127
Announce interval	250 ms	125 ms	1 s
Sync interval	125 ms	1/128 s	500 ms
Delay request interval	Sync interval	Sync interval	32 x Sync interval

== See also ==
- AES67, is a technical standard for audio over IP and Ethernet, and clock synchronization
- SMPTE 2022
- SMPTE 2110
