= Gibson MaGIC =

Audio-over-Ethernet protocol

MaGIC

Manufacturer info
- Manufacturer: Gibson Guitar Corporation
- Development date: 1999; 27 years ago

Network compatibility
- Switchable: No
- Routable: No
- Ethernet data rates: Fast Ethernet

Audio specifications
- Maximum sampling rate: 192 kHz
- Maximum bit depth: 32 bits

Media-accelerated Global Information Carrier (MaGIC) is an audio over Ethernet protocol developed by the Gibson Guitar Corporation in partnership with 3COM. It enables bidirectional transmission of multichannel audio data, control data, and instrument power.

Revision 1.0 was introduced in 1999; the most current revision 3.0c was released in 2003.

MaGIC is used in several guitar products, such as Gibson Digital Guitar.

== Capabilities ==
- Uses Category 5 UTP cables up to 100 m long
- Frame-compatible with Fast Ethernet
- 32 channels, 192 kHz sampling rate
  - 32-bit integer audio
  - 32-bit floating point audio
  - 24-bit integer audio with 4-bit channel status and 4-bit channel command
  - 32-bit raw data
- Supports line network topology, star topology, and a combination of the two

== Network protocol ==
In terms of ISO OSI model, MaGIC can use physical and link layer (MAC/LLC) based on 100 Mbit Fast Ethernet signalling specified in IEEE 802.3/IEEE 802.3af and IEEE 802.2, however MaGIC implements proprietary network and application layers which can be used with different physical layers such as Gigabit Ethernet or optical media.

The frame consists of 1776 bytes. The network protocol encapsulates each frame's application data (1506 bytes) into media payload (1024 bytes) and control payload (352 bytes) fields of the frame. The media payload is reserved for low-latency synchronous audio and video data, and control payload may encapsulate MaGIC control messages, MIDI data, and other protocols.

Media streams are transmitted synchronously without resampling or buffering, ensuring minimal latency; each stream has one source and one or more destinations. Control messages are generally broadcast to the entire network – each device processes the destination address and forwards to all neighbors if necessary.

== Application protocol ==
A MaGIC device consists of the following logical entities:

- Unit – an access point that sends and receives control messages;
- Components – access points for control applications such as power on/off switches, volume controls, control surfaces, or graphical user interfaces;
- Ports – represent either physical connections or user applications that send media to the network;
- Media slot routers – route media data streams through the network.

Individual control capabilities of the device are exposed through the MaGIC Control Protocol (MCP), which allows communication with Components in other devices (a maximum of 65535 per device).

The network elects a System Timing Master (STM), which is the source of synchronization for all devices. Timecode formats include MaGIC timecode and MIDI Time Code.

The control data consists of a 12-bit Control Message Code (CMC) 4-bit status field, 32-bit Source (Unit and Component, 16-bit each) and 32-bit Destination, and may contain up to 32 Kbytes of data in multiple frames.

The CMCs are defined into four classes:

- Network Management Messages (0-127)
- Well Known Application Protocols (128-511) – used for encapsulation of well-known high-level protocols or for transporting messages with a well-known format and structure (like MIDI).
- User Control Messages (512-1023) - proprietary user messages
- Reserved (1024-4095).

Control links are bi-directional communication pipes between several MaGIC devices, intended for control applications. For example, a control link allows the knob on one device to regulate the remotely located volume on another device through the MaGIC network. Control links allow remote management from a computer with a sophisticated GUI, which would act as a network supervisor that would manage other applications. Devices may also establish control links using proprietary mechanisms as long as they are compliant with this specification.

Network management messages
CMC	Name	Description
0x01	Operation Completion	Status Used for error reporting.
0x03	Change of STM	Forces device resynchronization.
0x05	Address Advertisement	Used for device address auto-configuration. Tentative address broadcast.
0x07	Address Conflict	Reports an address conflict between two or more devices.
0x09	Neighbor Advertisement	Reports device symbolic name to neighbor devices.
0x11	Add/Remove Link Record	Adds or removes a record to/from the control link table of a device component.
0x13	Establish/Drop Control Link	Establishes or disconnects a control link between two remote components.
0x15	Read/Clear Link Table	Reads or erases a control link table of a device component.
0x17	List of Linked Components	Provides list of addresses for linked components.
0x19	Read Link Parameters	Read parameters of a particular control link.
0x1B	List of Link Parameters	Provides information about a control link.
0x31	Set routing table	Programs port routing table.
0x33	Read routing table	Accesses port routing table data.
0x35	Routing table data	Reports content of port routing table.
0x41	Mute	Transmits a list of data slot enable/disable masks.
0x51	Read Attribute	Requests an attribute value.
0x53	Attribute Value	Transmits the requested attribute value.
