= SMPTE 2022 =

Professional digital video networking standard

SMPTE 2022 is a standard from the Society of Motion Picture and Television Engineers (SMPTE) that describes how to send digital video over an IP network. Video formats supported include MPEG-2 and serial digital interface The standard was introduced in 2007 and has been expanded in the years since.

The standard is published in eight parts.

- ST 2022-1:2007 - Forward Error Correction for Real-Time Video/Audio Transport Over IP Networks
- ST 2022-2:2007 - Unidirectional Transport of Constant Bit Rate MPEG-2 Transport Streams on IP Networks
- ST 2022-3:2010 - Unidirectional Transport of Variable Bit Rate MPEG-2 Transport Streams on IP Networks
- ST 2022-4:2011 - Unidirectional Transport of Non-Piecewise Constant Variable Bit Rate MPEG-2 Streams on IP Networks
- ST 2022-5:2013 - Forward Error Correction for Transport of High Bit Rate Media Signals over IP Networks (HBRMT)
- ST 2022-6:2012 - Transport of High Bit Rate Media Signals over IP Networks (HBRMT)
- ST 2022-7:2019 - Seamless Protection Switching of RTP Datagrams
- ST 2022-8:2019 - Professional Media Over Managed IP Networks: Timing of ST 2022-6 Streams in ST 2110-10 Systems

SMPTE 2022 is an important technology enabling the transition of broadcast systems to IP networking.

== High Bit Rate Media Transport ==
High Bit Rate Media Transport (HBRMT) formerly known as High Bit Rate Audio Video Over IP (HBRAV-IP), is a standard for data encapsulation and forward error correction (FEC) of high bit rate contribution oriented video/audio feed services, up to 3 Gbit/s over Ethernet networks. HBRMT is published as parts 5 and 6 of SMPTE 2022 by the SMPTE 32NF networking technology committee. HBRMT supports both SDI uncompressed and JPEG 2000 compressed video and audio formats.

== See also ==
- Audio over Ethernet
- Audio over IP
- Professional video over IP
- SMPTE 2059
- SMPTE 2110
- Voice over Internet Protocol
