= Livewire (networking) =

Real-time professional audio over IP networking

Livewire+
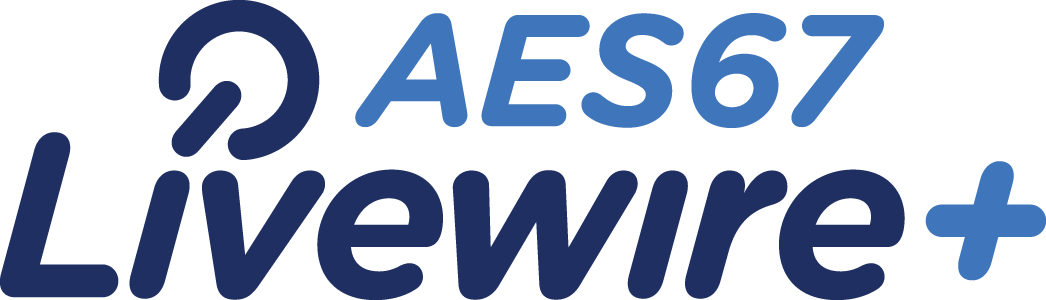

Manufacturer info
- Manufacturer: Axia Audio, a brand of Telos Alliance
- Development date: 2003; 23 years ago

Network compatibility
- Switchable: Yes
- Routable: Yes
- Ethernet data rates: Fast Ethernet, Gigabit Ethernet

Audio specifications
- Minimum latency: 0.75 ms
- Maximum sampling rate: 48 kHz
- Maximum bit depth: 24 bits

Livewire is an audio-over-IP system created by Axia Audio, a division of Telos Alliance. Its primary purpose is routing and distributing broadcast-quality audio in radio stations.

The original Livewire standard was introduced in 2003 and has since been superseded by a second version, Livewire+. Livewire+ includes compatibility with the AES67 and Ravenna standards to allow interoperability with equipment from other manufacturers. Designed as a superset of Livewire functionality utilizing common protocols and formats, Livewire+ is available as an open standard through Axia's Livewire+ Partner Program.

Livewire+ provides flexible routing and transport of audio streams using multicast networking, with the ability to connect any input to any output (known as "anywhere-to-anywhere routing"). Distribution utilises standard IP and Ethernet over twisted pair cabling.

== Protocol ==
The following table lists ports and protocols used in Livewire systems.

| Port | Protocol | Multicast Address | Purpose | Notes |
|---|---|---|---|---|
| 67, 68 | UDP | | BOOTP Server/Client | Remote IP address assignment |
| 93 | TCP | | Livewire Routing Protocol | Also provides transparent passing of custom messages, similar to the Ancillary Data Transmission feature of AES3 |
| 123 | UDP | | Network Time Protocol | |
| 514 | UDP | | Syslog | Activity logging to a syslog receiver. |
| 2055 | UDP | 239.192.255.4 | Multicast-based GPIO (CMsg2 protocol) | GPIO commands, GPIO node → console-type endpoint |
| 2060 | UDP | 239.192.255.4 | Multicast-based GPIO (CMsg2 protocol) | GPIO commands, console-type endpoint → GPIO node |
| 4000 | UDP | | Livewire Advertisement and Source Allocation Protocol | Verbose advertisement and source allocation requests |
| 4001 | UDP | 239.192.255.3 | Livewire Advertisement and Source Allocation Protocol | Periodic and verbose announcements; Source allocation state announcements and responses |
| 4002 | UDP | 239.192.255.3 | Engine Supervision Protocol | |
| 4010 | TCP | | Livewire Control Protocol | |
| 4011 | UDP | 239.192.255.4 | LWCP for Accessory Modules | Module → Console |
| 4012 | UDP | 239.192.255.3 | LWCP for Accessory Modules | Console → Module |
| 5004 | UDP | 239.192.x.x | RTP Livewire Audio | Last two address octets pertain to Axia channel ID, e.g. 9999 = 39 15 (hex 27 0F) |
| 5004 | UDP | 239.192.255.1 | Livewire High Speed Clock | One device assigns itself as the LAN-wide reference; all other devices slave to it |
| 7000 | UDP | 239.192.255.2 | Livewire Slow Speed Clock | One device assigns itself as the LAN-wide reference; all other devices slave to it |
| 9997 | TCP | | Protocol logging | Debug protocol logging for Element |
