= Telos Alliance =

American audio equipment manufacturer

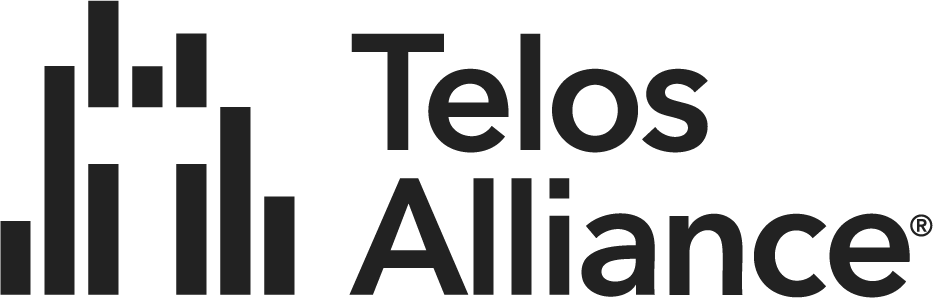
- Company type: Private
- Industry: Broadcasting
- Founded: 1985
- Founder: Steve Church
- Headquarters: Cleveland, Ohio, United States
- Products: On-air telephone systems, broadcast codecs, audio loggers, audio processors, mixing consoles, distribution systems, TV loudness monitoring and metering tools.
- Website: www.telosalliance.com

Telos Alliance is an American corporation manufacturing audio products primarily for broadcast stations. Headquartered in Cleveland, Ohio, US, the company is divided into six divisions:

- Telos Systems manufactures talkshow systems, IP audio codecs and transceivers, as well as streaming audio encoders.
- Omnia Audio makes audio processors for AM, FM, HD Radio, and Internet audio streaming applications.
- Axia Audio builds mixing consoles and audio distribution systems based on Livewire IP networking, an audio over Ethernet protocol.
- Linear Acoustic, whose product line includes TV loudness controls, metering and monitoring devices, along with mixing and metadata tools.
- 25-Seven Systems specializes in broadcast delays, time management and processing products.
- Minnetonka Audio Software delivers software-based audio automation to media production infrastructures.

== History and founder ==
Telos Alliance began as Telos Systems, a part-time project founded in 1985 by radio station engineer and talk show host (WFBQ, WMMS) Steve Church. Its first product was a telephone hybrid, the Telos 10, which was based on digital signal processing.

Church visited Fraunhofer in Germany in the late 1980s. There, he learned of MPEG-1 Audio Layer III audio coding. Telos became the first licensee in the United States of what is now known as MP3. MP3 became part of the solution to long-distance remote broadcasts using Integrated Services Digital Network (ISDN). This became the preferred alternative to leased lines available since the 1920s and satellite links available since the 1970s.

Audio over IP (AoIP) technology called Livewire made its debut in 2003 at the NAB Show in Las Vegas. The original Livewire-capable products included mixing consoles, analog, AES, mic and GPIO nodes. Other manufacturers began making their own AoIP broadcast equipment and there was a need for AoIP gear from different manufacturers to communicate with each other. Telos, along with other manufacturers, developed the AES67 standard for AoIP interoperability.

Church received many accolades for his work over the years. In 2010, the National Association of Broadcaster's (NAB) honored him with its Radio Engineering award. He stepped down as CEO of Telos in January 2011, and died on September 28, 2012, after a three-year battle with brain cancer.

In the following years, the company also expanded its product lines. Telos Systems continued to develop broadcast telephone systems, IP audio codecs & transceivers, and processing as well as encoding for streaming audio. Networked radio consoles, audio interfaces and routing control, networked intercom, and related software were created under the Axia Audio brand name. Audio processing, processing and encoding products for streaming audio, voice processing, analysis tools, and studio audio processing was developed under the Omnia Audio brand. The three companies were under the larger corporate umbrella known as Telos Systems.

Growth of the company continued with the acquisition of new partners. Linear Acoustic of Lancaster, PA was acquired, along with its product line of TV loudness controls, metering and monitoring devices, along with mixing and metadata tools. The corporate name was changed to The Telos Alliance. Shortly thereafter, 25-Seven came on board. This Boston-based company specializes in broadcast delays, time management and processing products which result in more efficient and profitable radio operations. In September 2015, Minnetonka Audio Software joined the Telos Alliance through a merger of the companies. The Minnetonka, Minnesota-based company delivers a file-based software alternative to hardware program optimizers, providing audio automation to media production infrastructures.

In September 2016, Linear Acoustic and Minnetonka Audio were rebranded as The TV Solutions Group, which provides consulting and partnerships with television broadcasters seeking to transition to the latest technology.
