= Data encapsulation =

Data encapsulation, also known as data hiding, is the mechanism whereby the implementation details of a class are kept hidden from the user. The user can only perform a restricted set of operations on the hidden members of the class by executing special functions commonly called methods to prevent attributes of objects from being easily viewed and accessed. Data encapsulation may refer to:

- The wrapping of private data in classes in object-oriented programming languages: see Encapsulation (computer programming), information hiding, separation of concerns
- The wrapping of network data by a lower layer in the OSI model into a single unit where a higher layer can extract the relevant data: see Encapsulation (networking)
