= Advanced Media Workflow Association =

Industry association promoting interoperability for IP-based professional media systems

Advanced Media Workflow Association, Inc. (AMWA)
- Formation: 2000
- Type: Industry association
- Headquarters: Bothell, WA
- Location: United States
- Official language: English
- Executive Director: Brad Gilmer
- Website: www.amwa.tv

The Advanced Media Workflow Association (AMWA) is an industry association focused on the content creation industry's move to IP-based architectures. AMWA promotes industry standards that allow diverse devices to discover and interoperate with each other reliably and securely.

== Work ==
As part of AMWA's collaborative process, AMWA specifications are published on GitHub.

AMWA's Framework for Interoperable Media Service (FIMS) integrates a common approach to integrate hardware devices and software components in TV production facilities

Networked Media Open Specifications (NMOS) provide discovery, registration and control services for the SMPTE ST 2110 media over IP protocol suite, and other media over IP applications.

The Advanced Authoring Format (AAF) is a multimedia file format for professional media creators. AAF provides cross-platform data interchange, designed for the video post-production and authoring environment.

AAF and Material Exchange Format (MXF) are successors to Open Media Framework (OMF).

== Published specifications ==
AMWA publishes interface specifications, data models, best current practices, application specifications and informative documents.

=== Interface specifications ===
- IS-01: AAF C++ SDK reference implementation.
- IS-03: Media Authoring with Java (MAJ) API
- IS-04: NMOS Discovery & Registration API
- IS-05: NMOS Device Connection Management API
- IS-06: NMOS Network Control
- IS-07: NMOS Event & Tally API
- IS-08: NMOS Audio Channel Mapping
- IS-09: NMOS System Parameters
- IS-10: NMOS Authorization
- IS-11: NMOS Stream Compatibility Management
- IS-12: NMOS Control Protocol

=== Data models ===
- MS-01: AAF Data Model
- MS-02: Mapping from AAF objects to Structured Storage
- MS-03: Structured Storage Specification
- MS-04: A model for identity and timing in AMWA NMOS specifications.
- MS-05-01: NMOS Control Architecture
- MS-05-02: NMOS Control Framework

=== Best current practices ===
- BCP-001-02: AMWA Specification Process
- BCP-002-01: Natural Grouping of NMOS Resources
- BCP-003-01: Secure Communication in NMOS Systems
- BCP-003-02: Authorization in NMOS Systems
- BCP-003-03: Certificate provisioning in NMOS Systems
- BCP-004-01: Receiver Capabilities
- BCP-005-01: EDID to Receiver Capabilities Mapping
- BCP-006-01: NMOS With JPEG XS

=== Application specifications ===
- AS-01: AAF Edit Protocol
- AS-02: MXF Versioning (was MXF Mastering Format)
- AS-03: MXF Program Delivery
- AS-05: AAF Effects Protocol
- AS-07: MXF Archive & Preservation
- AS-10: MXF for Production
- AS-11: Media Contribution File Formats
- AS-12: MXF Commercial Delivery

=== Informative Documents ===
- INFO-001: Control / Monitoring / Management Architectural Sprint
- INFO-002: Security Implementation Guide
- INFO-003: Sink Metadata Processing Architecture
- INFO-004: Implementation Guide for DNS-SD
- INFO-005: Implementation Guide for NMOS Controllers
- INFO-006: Implementation guide for NMOS Device Capabilities Control

== History ==
The AMWA began in January 2000 as the Advanced Authoring Format Association. The organization's name was officially changed in May 2007. The first NMOS specification (IS-04) was published in 2016.
