= Video Services Forum =

Industry association for media networking

- Nickname: VSF
- Formation: October 7, 1998; 28 years ago
- Website: vsf.tv

The Video Services Forum (VSF) is an industry association that provides a platform for cooperation and communication between organizations with a stake in media networking. VSF activities include standards development, interoperability testing and the ongoing VidTrans conferences.

VSF published the TR-03 and TR-04 technical recommendations for professional video over IP which were further developed by SMPTE to become SMPTE 2110.

== Awards ==
Technology & Engineering Emmy Award for "Standardization and Productization of JPEG2000 (J2K) Interoperability."

In 2021, VSF and SMPTE received a NATAS Technology & Engineering Emmy Award for "Standardization of SMPTE ST 2110"

In 2025, VSF, SMPTE, and the European Broadcasting Union (EBU) received a Television Academy Engineering, Science & Technology Emmy Award for the development of the SMPTE ST 2110 Suite of Standards.
