= Lawo =

German audio equipment manufacturer

- Industry: Professional Audio Equipment
- Founded: 1970
- Founder: Peter Lawo
- Headquarters: Rastatt, Germany
- Key people: Jamie Dunn, CEO; Claus Gärtner, CFO; Phil Myers, CTO; Andreas Hilmer, CMO; Ulrich Schnabl, COO; Christian Lukic, CSCO
- Number of employees: > 400
- Website: https://lawo.com

Lawo is an international company based in Rastatt, Germany, specializing in the manufacture of digital mixing consoles and other professional audio equipment. It was founded in 1970 by Peter Lawo, and is currently run by his son Philipp. The company is notable for supplying the audio mixing equipment for the 2012 London Olympics and Nine Network, and for sports events in Asia, North America and Australia.

The first developments of Peter Lawo were driven by the needs of composers of electronic music like Karlheinz Stockhausen. To Stockhausen's specifications Peter Lawo built an apparatus called "module 69 B" which was used to perform Stockhausen's composition Mantra. The success of this production led to the founding of the Experimentalstudio of the Heinrich Strobel Foundation of the Südwestfunk in 1971. Together with the first director of this studio, Hans Peter Haller, Peter Lawo developed the Halaphon. (The name resulted from the names of the developers: HA(ller)-LA(wo)-PHON). This machine became famous when being used in all the later works of composer Luigi Nono.

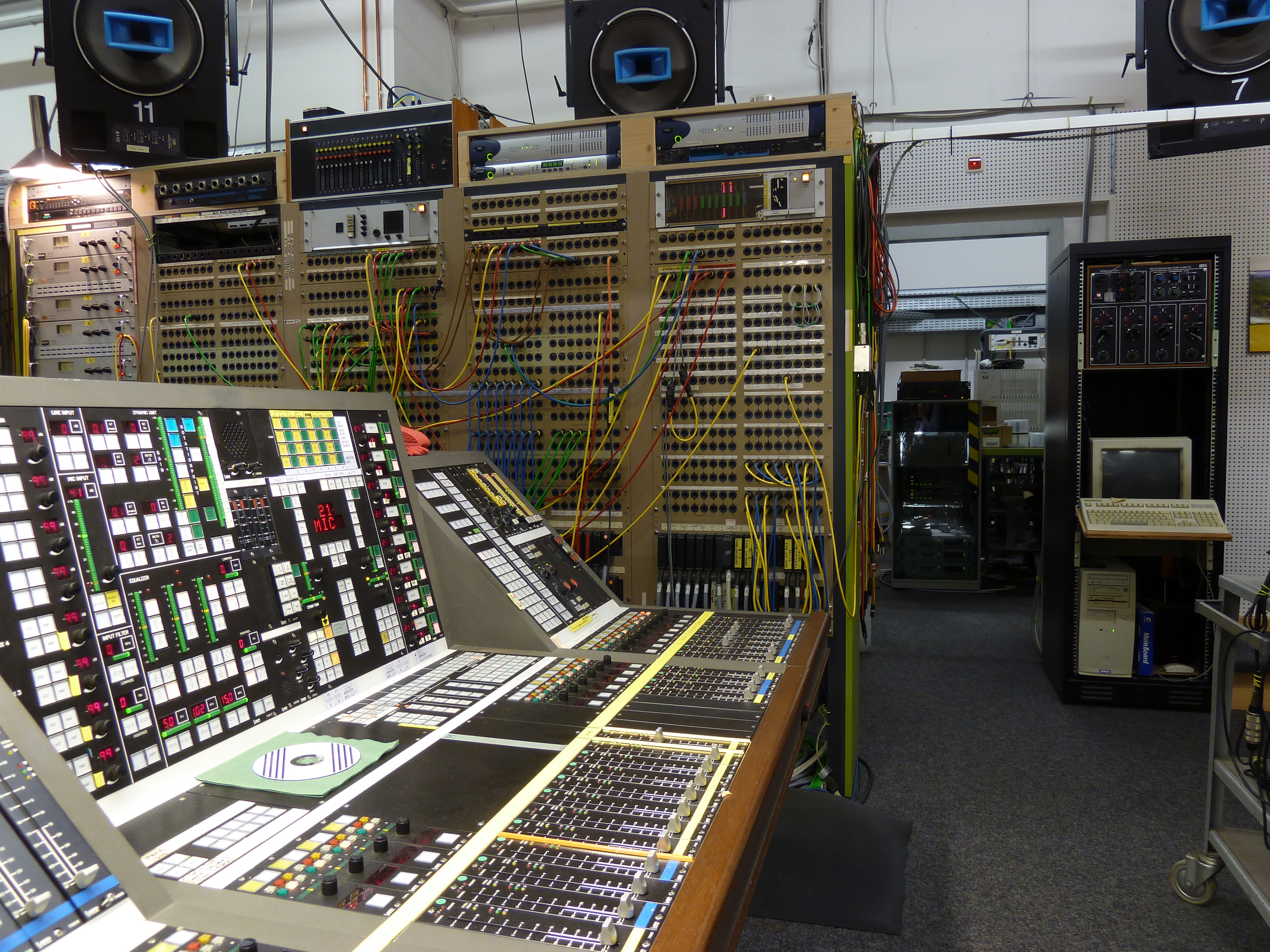
The Lawo PTR at Studio für Elektronische Musik, Cologne

Later, Peter Lawo developed mixing consoles for Stockhausen, whose composition Oktophonie was produced in the Studio for Electronic Music of the German Public Broadcaster WDR (Westdeutscher Rundfunk). For the production of this composition, the automatic recall of very fast fader movements was used—which was made possible by Lawo's hybrid mixing console PTR ("Programmierbare Ton Regie" = programmable audio control).

== History ==
1970 – founded by Peter Lawo as engineer's office for electronic equipment

- 1970s – Development of electronic sound processors (Vocoder, Halaphon and alike) and analog mixing consoles
- 1980s – Development of a programmable audio mixing console called PTR with digital control and analog signal processing
- 1990s – Development of the digital mc series mixing consoles
- 2007 – Introduction of DAW plugins for Windows.
- 2008 – Lawo acquire majority shares in French digital audio company Innovason.
- 2010 – Introduction of the Sapphire mixing console at the IBC Exhibition in Amsterdam.
- 2012 – 50 Lawo consoles were used for sound mixing in the 2012 London Olympics.
