= Plugtest =

Event at which manufacturers test interoperability of their products

A plugtest or plugfest is an event based on a certain technical standard where the designers of electronic equipment or software test the interoperability of their products or designs with those of other manufacturers. It could be literally plugging company A's cable into company B's socket, or a more elaborate test resembling a realistic scenario.

The technical goal is twofold: check compliance with the standard, and test the effectiveness of the standard. The latter could be the case when the standard is ambiguous. A simplified example is: the width of a plug is prescribed, but vendors use different lengths.

Plugtests can be formal and have public test scores or informal and private. Besides helping vendors improve their interoperability, plugtests help create awareness about the standard and can improve transparency on compliance.

== Examples ==
- The CEA organizes PlugFests for interoperability testing between HDMI, sink, and repeater devices.
- VESA organizes PlugTests for DisplayPort device designers and vendors.
- PlugTests organized for USB device vendors, and cable operators testing DOCSIS interoperability.
- OpenDoc Society arranges OpenDocument ODF Plugfests in conjunction with industry associations including the OpenForum Europe, OpenUK and the UK Government Digital Service
- The SCSI Trade Association organizes regular Serial Attached SCSI plugfests to test for early device interoperability.
- The EEBUS Initiative e.V. organizes plugfests before releasing new use case specifications in order to test the practicability and robustness of device interoperability. The participants define in advance a set of cross-industry use cases, which they then implement and test for mutual interoperability (E.g., the electric vehicle communicates with the household energy management system in order to avoid load peaks).
- O-RAN ALLIANCE e.V. Global PlugFests provide a global platform for Radio Access Network (RAN) equipment manufacturers, service providers, universities, and research institutions to test, integrate, and validate technology and solutions for open and intelligent RAN, based on O-RAN ALLIANCE specifications.
