= Q-LAN =

Real-time professional audio over IP networking

Manufacturer info
- Manufacturer: QSC Audio Products
- Development date: 2009; 16 years ago

Network compatibility
- Switchable: Yes
- Routable: Yes
- Ethernet data rates: Gigabit Ethernet

Audio specifications
- Minimum latency: 1 ms
- Maximum channels per link: 1024 (512x512)
- Maximum sampling rate: 48 kHz
- Maximum bit depth: 32-bit floating point

Q-LAN is the audio over IP audio networking technology component of the Q-Sys platform from QSC Audio Products.
