= Wheatstone Corporation =

American broadcast equipment manufacturer

- Type: Private
- Industry: Broadcasting
- Founded: 1974; 52 years ago
- Founder: Gary Snow
- Headquarters: New Bern, North Carolina, United States
- Products: Digital audio consoles and control surfaces, analog audio consoles, networked digital audio systems, audio-over-IP, digital audio editing hardware and software, signal processing for on-air and studio applications, and software.
- Website: wheatstone.com

Wheatstone Corporation is an American company that produces digital and analog professional audio equipment for broadcast radio, television, and new media. Products include audio consoles, Audio over IP (AoIP) audio networking, audio processing, audio recording and editing, and custom furniture. The corporation also does business under the brand names Audioarts Engineering, Pacific Research & Engineering, and VoxPro.

== Founder ==
Gary Snow’s interest in audio came early: “By age 12, I was running a neighborhood radio and TV repair shop. I built my first stereo system at 15 and then moved on to guitar amps and loudspeaker enclosures,” Snow said. After high school, Gary took a job repairing amplifiers and special effects devices while attending Onondaga Community College in Syracuse, New York, where he majored in electrical engineering.

Snow’s career then progressed to larger companies, where he engaged in more sophisticated high fidelity repair and installations. Gary explained, “I was sent to KLH, McIntosh Laboratories, and the Allen Organ Company for further technical training. In 1971, I was offered employment at Theatre Sound Inc. in New Haven, Connecticut, where I expanded into electronic circuit design, and large system design and installation.”

After some encouragement by friends, he produced a "for sale" product in 1974. Snow chose the name "Audioarts" for his nascent company.

Snow is the recipient of three Industry Innovator awards announced by trade publications in 2017.

== History ==
Wheatstone Corporation was founded as Audioarts Engineering in 1974. and was incorporated under its current name in 1981. Originally founded in Bethany, Connecticut, the company moved twice, first to Syracuse, New York in 1986, then to its present location just outside New Bern, North Carolina in 1998.

The company's first product was a simple disco mixer designed by the founder. In the years that followed, Audioarts designed and sold outboard equipment for the recording industry, including one of the earliest parametric equalizers. In 1976 its first console, the Audioarts 2000, was introduced.

In 1981, working under the internal project name "Wheatstone," Audioarts developed a very full-featured sound reinforcement console. Partly due to the success of this console, the company subsequently incorporated as Wheatstone Corporation.

== Brands ==
In addition to Wheatstone, the corporation also markets products under the following brand names:

- Audioarts Engineering is Wheatstone's brand of standalone analog radio consoles. Audioarts was the original name of the corporation.
- Pacific Research & Engineering (PR&E) is a brand of digital audio consoles for radio. The brand was acquired in February 2017 from GatesAir, and the brand has been previously marketed by Harris Corporation.
- VoxPro is Wheatstone's digital audio recording, playout, and editing system. The brand was acquired in 2015.

== Notable Products ==
- WheatNet-IP is an Audio over IP (AoIP) network with applications in broadcast radio, television, and other applications. It provides routing and distribution of audio and logic.
- VoxPro is a widely used digital recording and editing system optimized for live radio use. It allows simple and rapid editing of telephone calls, interviews, and other content.
- Wheatstone Processing is a line of processing equipment designed to optimize the on-air sound of broadcast and streaming radio. Wheatstone also manufactures equipment for processing of individual microphones and external feeds.
- Networked Control Surfaces include consoles connected to the audio network via Ethernet. Wheatstone markets a range of these for both radio and television audio use.
