= QSC Audio Products =

American audio equipment manufacturer

QSC, LLC
- Type: Public
- Industry: Audio electronics, Audiovisual automation, Videoconferencing, Technology
- Founded: California (1968)
- Founders: Patrick Quilter; Barry Andrews; John Andrews
- Headquarters: Costa Mesa, California, United States
- Key people: Jatan Shah, CEO; Anna Csontos, CRO; Chris Jaynes, CTO
- Products: Audio amplifiers, Video conferencing systems, loudspeakers, and digital signal processing
- Brands: Q-SYS
- Number of employees: 1000+
- Parent: Acuity Brands
- Website: www.qsc.com

QSC is an American manufacturer of audio, video and control products such as amplifiers, loudspeakers, cameras, video endpoints, and digital signal processors, including the Q-SYS networked audio, video and control platform.

QSC and Q-SYS products are used by audio and video professionals for commercial applications, including enterprise collaboration, higher education, sports venues, themed entertainment, and cinema customers worldwide.

The company holds five offices in the United States, including Austin, Boulder, Fort Wayne, San Luis Obispo, and its headquarters in Costa Mesa, with further international presence in London, Nieuwegein, Sinsheim, Zurich, Wattens, Dubai, Hong Kong, Beijing, Singapore, Bangalore, and Tokyo.

== History ==
The company was founded in 1968 by Patrick Howe Quilter, who serves as chairman of the board of directors. Quilter was at the time an engineering student with a keen interest in electronics and music. In 1967, Quilter had learned that the bass player in his brother’s high school band was searching for an affordable bass amp. When Quilter learned his budget was $250.00, he said “I could probably make you something for that kind of money,” giving birth to the first QSC amp. With many musician friends and acquaintances seeking him out to make guitar amps, he left school to start his company with the financial backing of family and friends.

At first, the company was a storefront operation in Costa Mesa, California, a combination of manufacturing and retail operations under one roof. The amplifiers were built in the back and sold out front. The first employees were mostly friends helping out. The early guitar amplifiers bore names like the Duck Amp and the Quilter Sound Thing.

The company adopted the name Quilter Sound Company, which was eventually shortened to the initials "QSC" and was known as QSC Audio Products, Inc. for many years. The company was officially renamed QSC, LLC in 2015.

== Expansion ==
After some years, the professional power amplifier portion of the business overtook the production of guitar amplifiers. Meanwhile, QSC developed more conventional sales channels in retail music and pro audio stores and also started working with export distributors. Beginning in the early 1980s, Pat Quilter pursued his interest in more electrically efficient methods of power amplification by refining class G (and later, class H) technology as an extension of class AB, primarily for higher-power models.

In the early 1990s, QSC diversified from power amplifiers by starting the development of network audio systems for remote control and monitoring of amplifier systems. QSC called its system QSControl (pronounced "Q's Control"). The company was one of the first licensees of the MediaLink networking technology developed by the Lone Wolf Corp. for professional audio systems. MediaLink, however, did not prove robust enough for professional audio users, so by the mid-1990s, QSC abandoned it in favor of Ethernet-based networking, which was becoming more affordable and ubiquitous. At about the same time, QSC licensed CobraNet technology from Peak Audio to develop products that would distribute multiple channels of audio signals in the digital domain over common Fast Ethernet media.

In the late 1990s, QSC started a loudspeaker research and development group within its engineering department. Within a couple years, QSC offered loudspeaker systems for sale and is today a major supplier of loudspeaker systems in the professional audio industry.

== Present ==
In July of 2022, QSC announced a split in its divisions, differentiating between Q-SYS and QSC Pro Audio.

The Q-SYS division develops a software and hardware platform for networked audio, video and control, with products such as the Q-SYS Core Processors, NV Series video endpoints, NC Series PTZ Cameras, AcousticDesign loudspeakers, and more.

The QSC Pro Audio division develops a range of non-networked amplifiers, loudspeakers, and line arrays for applications in performance venues, cinemas and event productions.

== Acquisitions ==
In September of 2016, QSC announced its acquisition of Ultra-Stereo Labs a prominent player in cinema sound systems. In October of 2019, the company announced the acquisition of Attero Tech, expanding its portfolio of audio networked I/O endpoints.

In June 2023, Q-SYS acquired the Swiss startup Seervision AG for an undisclosed amount, marking its first AI technology acquisition. The agreement is Q-SYS' first pivot toward intelligent video collaboration based in the startup's computer vision, machine learning, and scene perception expertise, having launched a combined solution named VisionSuite.

== Acquisition by Acuity ==
On October 24, 2024, Acuity (NYSE: AYI) announced it entered into an agreement to acquire QSC for $1.215 billion, joining Acuity’s Intelligent Spaces division. The acquisition was finalized on January 7, 2025.

In March 2025, CEO Joe Pham retired and was replaced by former COO Jatan Shah.
