= SMPTE 2110 =

Professional digital video networking standard

SMPTE 2110 is a suite of standards from the Society of Motion Picture and Television Engineers (SMPTE) that describes how to send digital media over an IP network.

SMPTE 2110 is intended to be used within broadcast production and distribution facilities where quality and flexibility are more important than bandwidth efficiency.

== History ==
SMPTE 2110 was based on the TR-03 and TR-04 work published by the Video Services Forum on 12 November 2015. The first four parts of SMPTE 2110, -10, -20, -21 and -30, were published by SMPTE on 27 November 2017. Other parts, including recommended practices, were added later, and several parts were updated in 2022.

== Standard ==
SMPTE 2110 is specified in multiple interrelated standards (ST) and recommended practices (RP):

- ST 2110-10 - System architecture and synchronization: essences, RTP, SDP and PTP
- ST 2110-20 - Uncompressed video transport, based on SMPTE 2022-6
- ST 2110-21 - Traffic shaping and network delivery timing
- ST 2110-22 - Constant Bit-Rate Compressed Video transport
- RP 2110-23 - Single Video Essence Transport over Multiple ST 2110-20 Streams
- RP 2110-24 - Special Considerations for Standard Definition Video Using SMPTE ST 2110-20
- RP 2110-25 - Measurement Practices
- ST 2110-30 - Audio transport, based on AES67
- ST 2110-31 - Transport of AES3 formatted audio
- ST 2110-40 - Transport of ancillary data
- ST 2110-41 - Fast metadata framework
- ST 2110-43 - Transport of Timed Text Markup Language for captions and subtitles in systems conforming to SMPTE ST 2110-10.

=== ST 2110-10: System architecture and synchronization ===
There are several important features of ST 2110-10:

- Individual audio, video and ancillary data tracks or clips are carried as separate individual streams. These streams are referred to as "essences", e.g., a 5.1 JPEG mp4 clip could have 9 essences: a video essence, 6 separate audio essences, and two closed caption essences, English and Chinese.
- Real-time Transport Protocol (RTP) is used to transmit streaming essences.
- Session Initiation Protocol (SIP) is used to manage the connection and distribution of RTP streams, including IP multicast one-to-many distribution.
- Precision Time Protocol (PTP) provides global microsecond accuracy timing of all essences. Synchronization is based on SMPTE 2059.

=== ST 2110-20: Uncompressed video transport ===
SMPTE 2110-20 defines the key requirements for transporting uncompressed video essence and is built on the IETF RFC 4175, RTP Payload Format for Uncompressed Video.

=== ST 2110-21: Transmission timing ===
SMPTE 2110-21 defines three classes of devices based on their transmission timing behavior: NL (for Narrow Linear), N (for Narrow), and W (for Wide). NL senders transmit at a constant bit rate. N senders may suspend transmission during the vertical blanking interval. W senders are intended to support software implementations of 2110 and adhere to less rigorous transmission timing requirements. A type W receiver should be able to receive from any type of sender.

=== ST 2110-22: Constant bit-rate compressed video transport ===
SMPTE 2110-22 defines the key requirements for transporting compressed video essence. The compression standard needs to provide a constant bitrate, a defined RTP payload and low latency to satisfy the needs of Live production. The majority of the SMPTE 2110-22 implementations uses the JPEG XS lightweight low latency compression standard created by the Joint Photographic Experts Group to answer the requirements of the SMPTE 2110 standard. The JPEG XS codec has only a few video lines of latency in software and hardware implementations,, which is less than 1 millisecond. SMPTE 2110-22 is used as an alternative to uncompressed video (SMPTE 2110-20) in a live production environment. SMPTE 2110-22 is indeed very suitable for using less bandwidth in local live IP production, remote production, contribution or cloud-based production.

== Awards ==
In 2021, SMPTE and the Video Services Forum (VSF) received a NATAS Technology & Engineering Emmy Award for "Standardization of SMPTE ST 2110"

In 2025, SMPTE, VSF, and the European Broadcasting Union (EBU) received a Television Academy Engineering, Science & Technology Emmy Award for the development of the SMPTE ST 2110 Suite of Standards.
