= Digital mixing console =

Device used to manipulate audio input signals

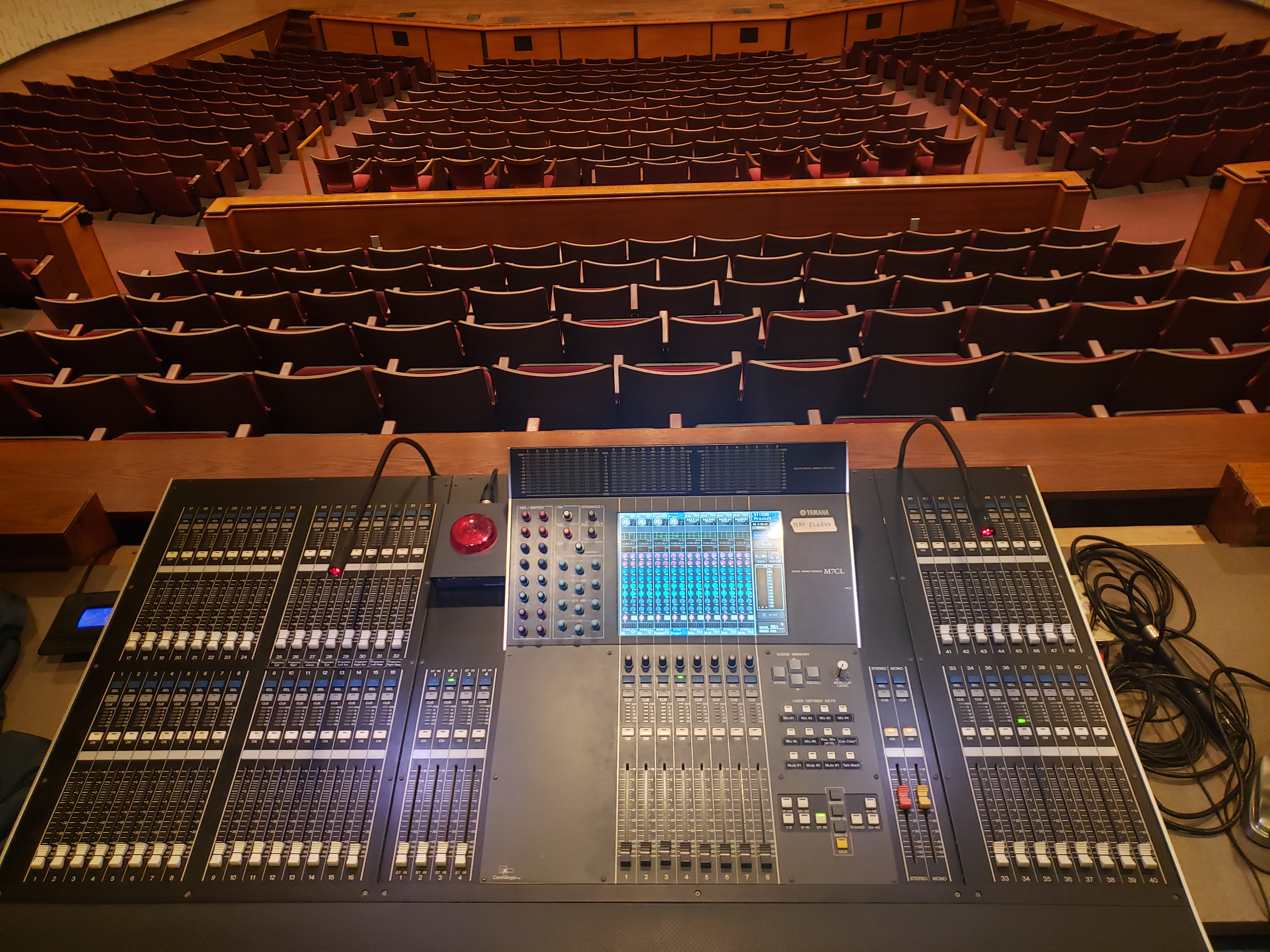
Yamaha M7CL in place for a live production

A digital mixing console (DMC) is a type of electronic mixing console, typically used in professional audio and sound work. It is used to combine, route, and change the dynamics, equalization and other properties of multiple audio input signals, using digital signal processing rather than analog circuitry. The digital audio samples, which is the internal representation of the analog inputs, are summed to what is known as a master channel to produce a combined output. A professional digital mixing console is a dedicated desk or control surface produced exclusively for the task and is typically more robust in terms of user control, processing power and quality of audio effects. However, a computer can also perform the same function since it can mimic its interface, input and output.

== Uses ==
Digital mixing consoles are typically used in recording studios, public address systems, sound reinforcement systems, broadcasting, television, and film post-production.

=== Common sound system problems and solutions ===
Most DMCs are expensive and sophisticated tools. The most common issue related to the DMC is the complex structure, which can be difficult to navigate without previous experience or knowledge of the system. The user usually requires a basic understanding of signal flow, audio terminology, and hardware implementation.

Part of the solution to alleviate operator issues is to automate whenever possible. The advent of modern digital computer technology has now made it possible to install sound system components that will, to some extent, operate themselves.

A digital mixing console can offset the lack of operator experience because it can store the settings programmed by an expert mixing engineer. After everything is properly adjusted, that set-up is assigned a name and stored in the memory. Afterwards, a less knowledgeable operator can simply select that setting on their console or computer.

One can easily program many different preset configurations or "snapshots," into the mixing console. Default configurations that are included with the DMC are known as presets. Once a stored setting is recalled, the operator can still make manual volume adjustments, etc., without affecting the stored program. In other words, they can change a lot of stuff and all one has to do is hit the recall and the mixer automatically returns to all of the correct start-up settings.

Another pitfall in terms of live applications is improper location of the equipment. No sound operator can properly adjust a live sound system unless he can hear exactly what the majority of the audience hears, yet for issues related to space, appearance and security, one cannot always locate their sound control equipment in the middle of their auditorium. This is even more of a problem if the auditorium is a multi-use building that is often converted for other events. A digital mixer may solve this problem: a sound operator can operate the whole sound system from a laptop computer. With the proper set-up, it can even be done by a wireless tablet for increased mobility. In fact, many of the digital mixer's functions are easier to operate from a computer screen than the actual mixing console.

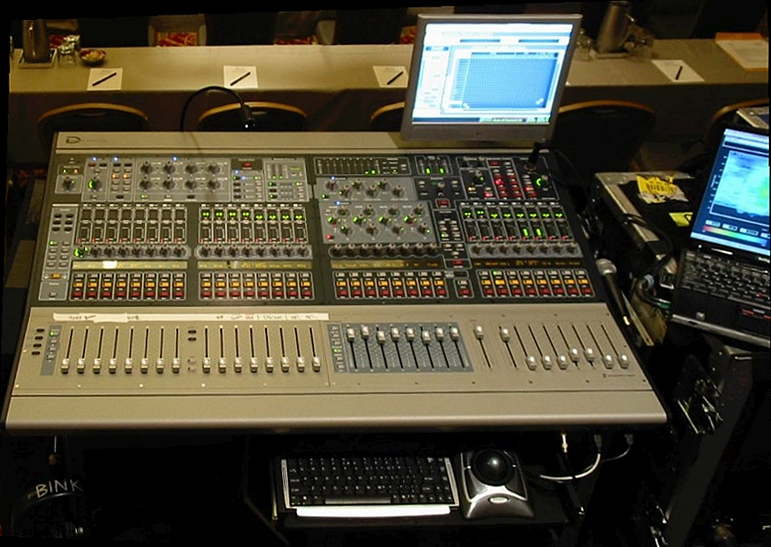
Digidesign's Venue Profile mixer on location at a corporate event. This mixer allows plugins from third-party vendors.

Another advantage of DMCs is the abundance of control features that it provides for each input channel. The built-in effects of typical DMCs are robust and include gates, compressor limiters, equalizers, feedback controllers, and other signal processing hardware. One advantage of the large number of internal effects is that a DMC system is less vulnerable to failure and outside interference than a set-up using outboard hardware.

Many digital mixers have controls that mimic the classic look and feel of analog mixers. This is comparable to a fly-by-wire system in modern aircraft. The controls are similar, but the underlying mechanism has changed from voltage levels to binary information.

Third-party plug ins can add functionality in a digital mixer. Plugins allow for further expansion of the mixer's on-board equalization, compression and reverberation effects.

=== Using dual DMCs to improve live recording ===
In truly professional broadcast and recording applications, one does not use what is referred to as the house mix for high quality audio recordings. The reason for this is that when engineering live sound for any auditorium, one must deal with the acoustic parameters of that particular auditorium. This requires various adjustments of equalization, bass, treble, volume, etc. While those adjustments may enhance the sound quality in the auditorium, they are not necessarily needed for the recording. In fact, those house mix adjustments often diminish the quality of the recorded sound. Once the bass, treble, volume and other effects of the house mix are added to the recording mix, it is most difficult to correct. In the reverse, adjustments and signal processing effects that are often used to enhance a recording mix are not always needed in the house mix.

In order to facilitate this, the signals must be split and provided to OB, recording crew or film crews. This split can be analog or digital; an analog split will normally be a feed of all stage signals split either passively or through an isolated transformer split. Transformers are preferred as they provide isolation and prevent microphone preamps on different systems interacting, for example a recording pre-amp causing level change at FOH or Monitors. A digital split can come in many forms, Often AES/EBU, MADI, Firewire direct to DAW, or increasingly network aware digital snake formats, such as AVB, Dante, Ethersound or Rocknet, many other proprietary formats also exist.

== Popular product examples ==
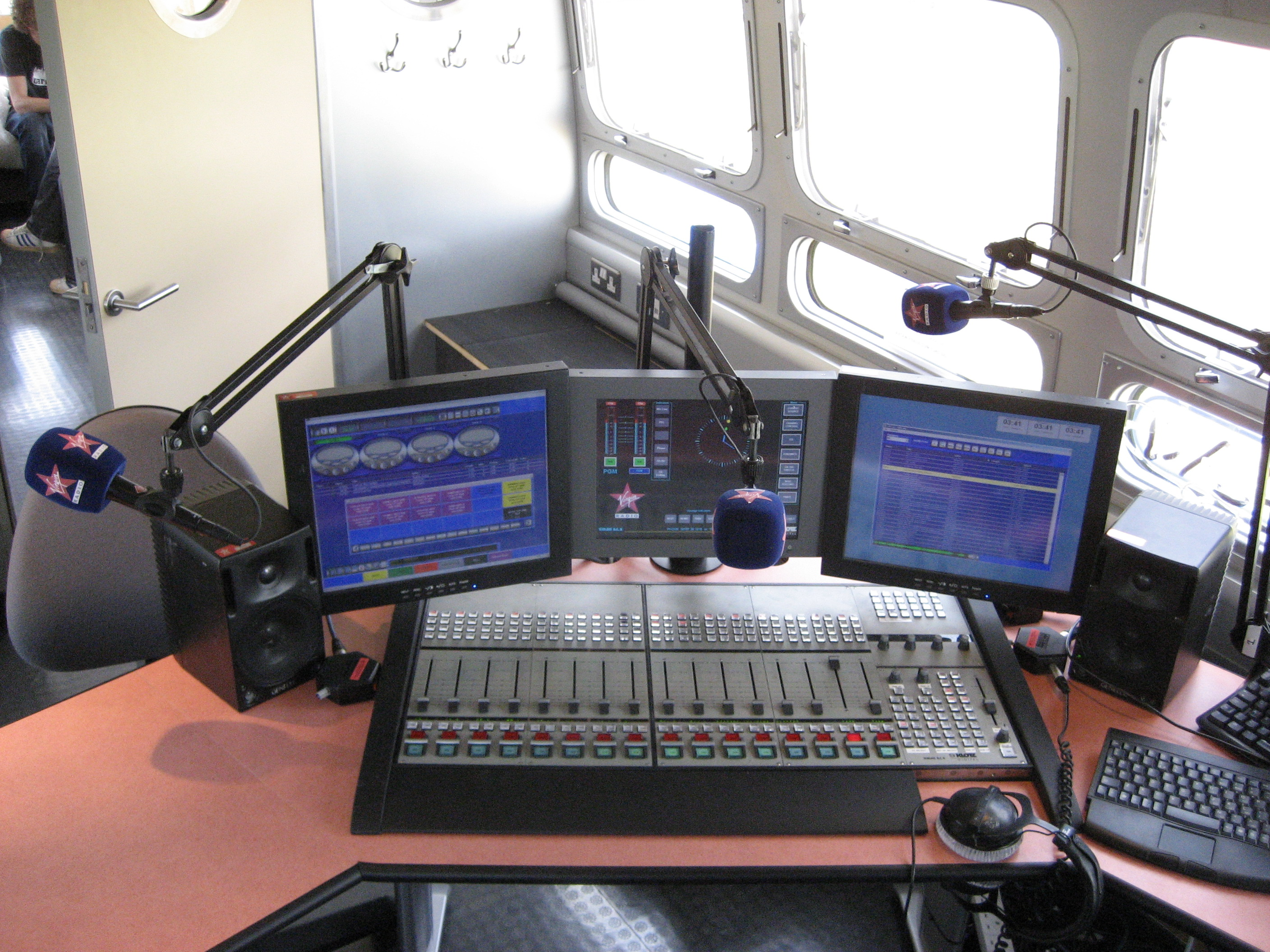
Klotz Digital's Vadis DC II mixer in use at a Virgin Radio outside broadcast

- Allen & Heath QU, GLD, SQ series, Avantis and dLive
- Behringer X32, xr18, WING
- Cadac Electronics S-Digital
- DiGiCo D1 Live, D5 Live, D5T, SD7, SD5, SD10, SD12, SD8, SD8-24, SD9 and SD11
- Avid D-Show Venue, Venue S6L D-Show Profile, and SC 48
- Innovason SY48 and SY80
- Klotz Digital's AEON and D.C.II, in the radio broadcast segment
- Lawo mc²56, mc²66, mc²90
- Mackie TT24, DL806, DL1608, DL32R, DLZ Creator (XS)
- Midas XL8, PROX, M32, PRO9, PRO6, PRO3, PRO2/PRO2C, and PRO1 digital consoles, and the VeniceF and VeniceU analog/digital hybrid consoles
- PreSonus StudioLive RM16, RM32, 16.0.2, 16.4.2 and 24.4.2
- RML Labs Software Audio Console (SAC)
- Røde RØDECaster (Duo, Pro, Pro2, Video)
- Roland M-300, M-380, M-400, M-480, M-5000 and Edirol M-16DX
- Soundcraft Si Expression, Si Performer, Ui12 and Ui16, Vi3000, Vi1, Vi2, Vi4 and Vi6, Vi5000 and Vi7000
- Solid State Logic L500 Plus, L300 and L200
- Studer Vista 8
- Tascam DM3200 and DM4800
- Yamaha 01V, LS9, M7CL, DM1000, DM2000, PM5D, PM1D, PM3/5/7/10 Rivage, DM3/5/7, QL and CL series.
