= Venue (sound system) =

Brand of digital mixing consoles

VENUE is a brand of live sound digital mixing consoles introduced by Digidesign in February 2005. The family now includes 5 different consoles and a number of ways they can be configured. They can all be connected to Pro Tools, the audio editing software also created by Avid/Digidesign, to provide recording and 'Virtual Soundcheck' facilities. One of the system's key marketing points is its use of the same AAX DSP/TDM plugins as Pro Tools, an industry standard digital audio workstation (DAW). This is designed to enable the sounds recorded by the artist in the studio to be easily recreated on stage, and to allow for greater flexibility in signal processing without heavy and mechanical-shock-sensitive racks of external processors. There is also a PC-based offline editor for creation and editing of show files, although there is no audio processing in the editor.

Digidesign was acquired by Avid Technology in 1995, but its products continued to be branded Digidesign until the brand was phased out in 2010, and VENUE systems are now branded Avid.

== Console products ==
=== D-Show ===
This was the first and largest control surface in the VENUE range, and was discontinued in 2015. The main unit, which includes a trackball, master controls, faders and meters, can be expanded with up to three sidecars to give a maximum of 56 faders. One sidecar was included in the standard package.

The console can either be connected to the Mix Rack, which contains all FOH I/O, DSP and stage I/O in one rack, or to the combination of an FOH rack and a Stage Rack. The FOH rack contains the DSP and a small amount of inputs and outputs, and the Stage Rack contains the main stage I/O. They are linked using a digital snake cable, with an option to use a redundant cable in parallel. There can be a maximum of two Stage Racks linked to one FOH rack.

=== Profile ===
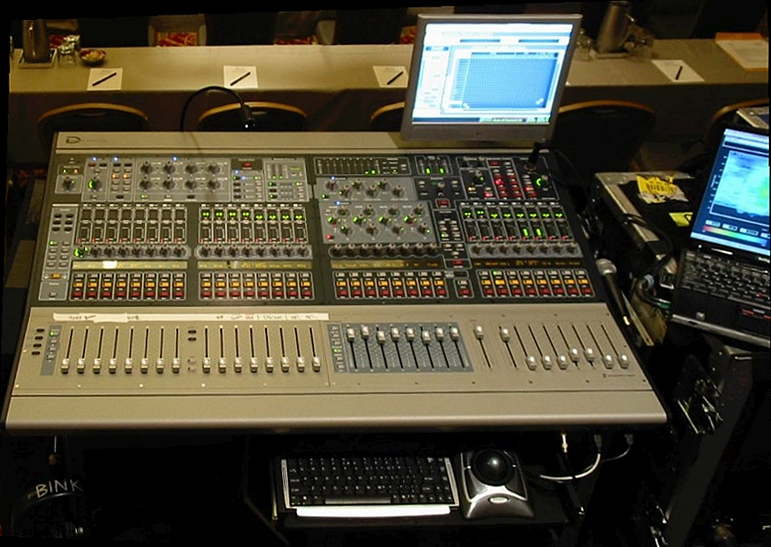
Profile at a corporate event

This smaller console contains all of the features of the larger console in a smaller form factor, and quickly became the industry's standard touring and festival console for many years. Though it has fewer input faders, it can still run the same show, as it can be connected to the same combinations of inputs and outputs described above. Avid sold its last Profile and Mix Rack consoles in the Summer of 2016, although they are still supported.

The Profile carries 33 motorized faders: 24 to address banks of inputs and effects returns, eight to address banks of outputs and VCAs, and one to control the master Left–Center–Right output, also configurable as Left–Right plus Mono.

Profile itself is just a control surface that must be used with either local and remote stage racks, or with one Mix Rack that combines processing and inputs/outputs. Mix Rack is essentially a SC48 without control surface.

=== SC48 and SC48 Remote ===
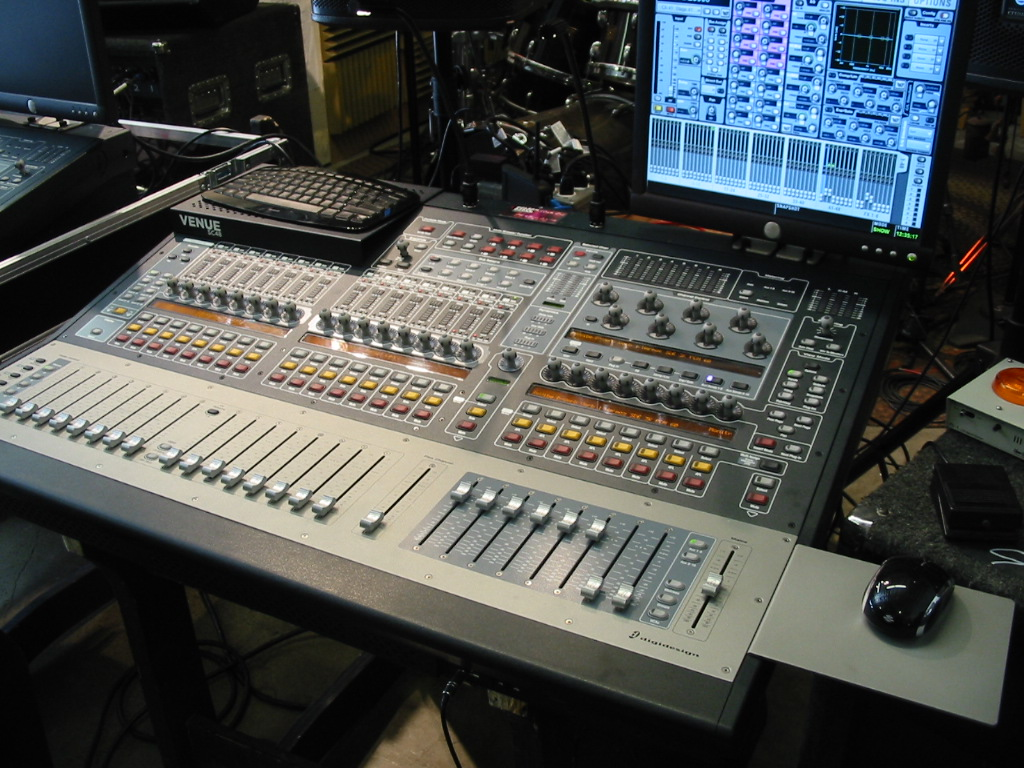
SC48 in a warehouse shop

The SC48 is all-in-one box VENUE system, where all processing, inputs and outputs is built into console. This feature allows it to 'drop into' existing wiring systems where an analogue console had been used. Outwardly it appears quite similar to a smaller version of the Profile, and was introduced as the 'starter' console in the range. Recently a remote rack option became available for SC48, either add-on to existing system in form of an empty rack where user can relocate I/O boards from main SC48 unit, or order new system (SC48 with remote stage rack) with remote I/O preinstalled.

As with its larger predecessors, the SC48's master output section can be configured as Left–Center–Right or Left–Right plus Mono. The control surface has 26 motorized faders: 16 to address banks of inputs and effects returns, one to link to any desired input, eight to address banks of outputs and VCAs, and one to control master output. An expansion slot at the rear panel allows one of several options: 16 analog outputs can be added; eight analog and eight AES3 digital outputs can be added; or A-Net connectivity can be achieved with external Aviom Pro16 personal monitor mixers.

=== S3L-X ===
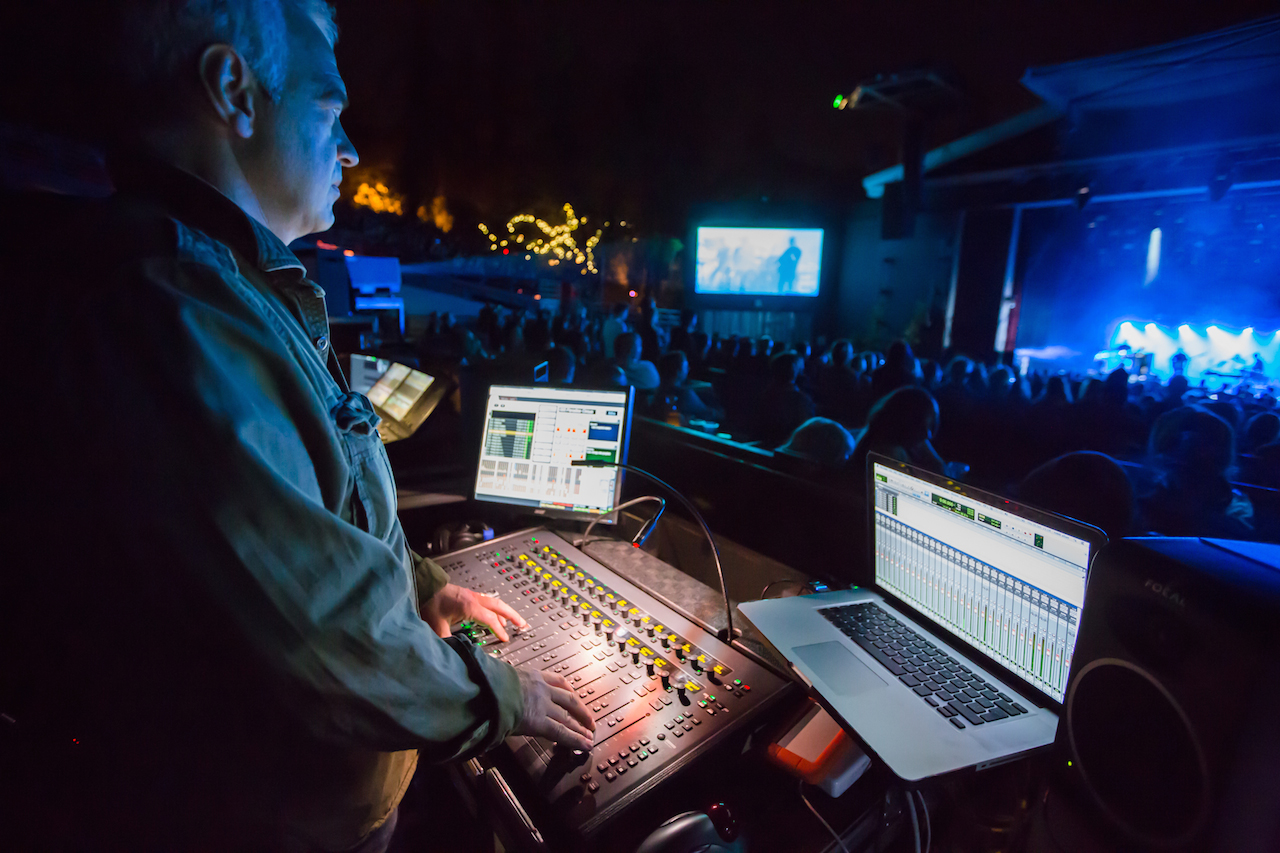
Robb Allan mixing Massive Attack on S3L-X

VENUE | S3L-X was introduced in 2013 and features the smallest footprint of any VENUE console, with 16 faders and 32 knobs. The modular system was Avid's first live console to be built on an Ethernet AVB architecture that connects the S3 control surface, up to four Stage 16 I/O racks, and the E3 Engine over Cat5e cables. The system can support up to 64 inputs and was the first VENUE system to enable the sharing of I/O between systems over the Ethernet AVB network. A unique feature of the system is that the S3 control surface can be used as a standalone DAW mixer using Avid's EUCON Ethernet control protocol, which is supported by Avid Pro Tools and Media Composer applications as well as Steinberg Cubase and Nuendo, Apple Logic, and others.

=== S6L ===
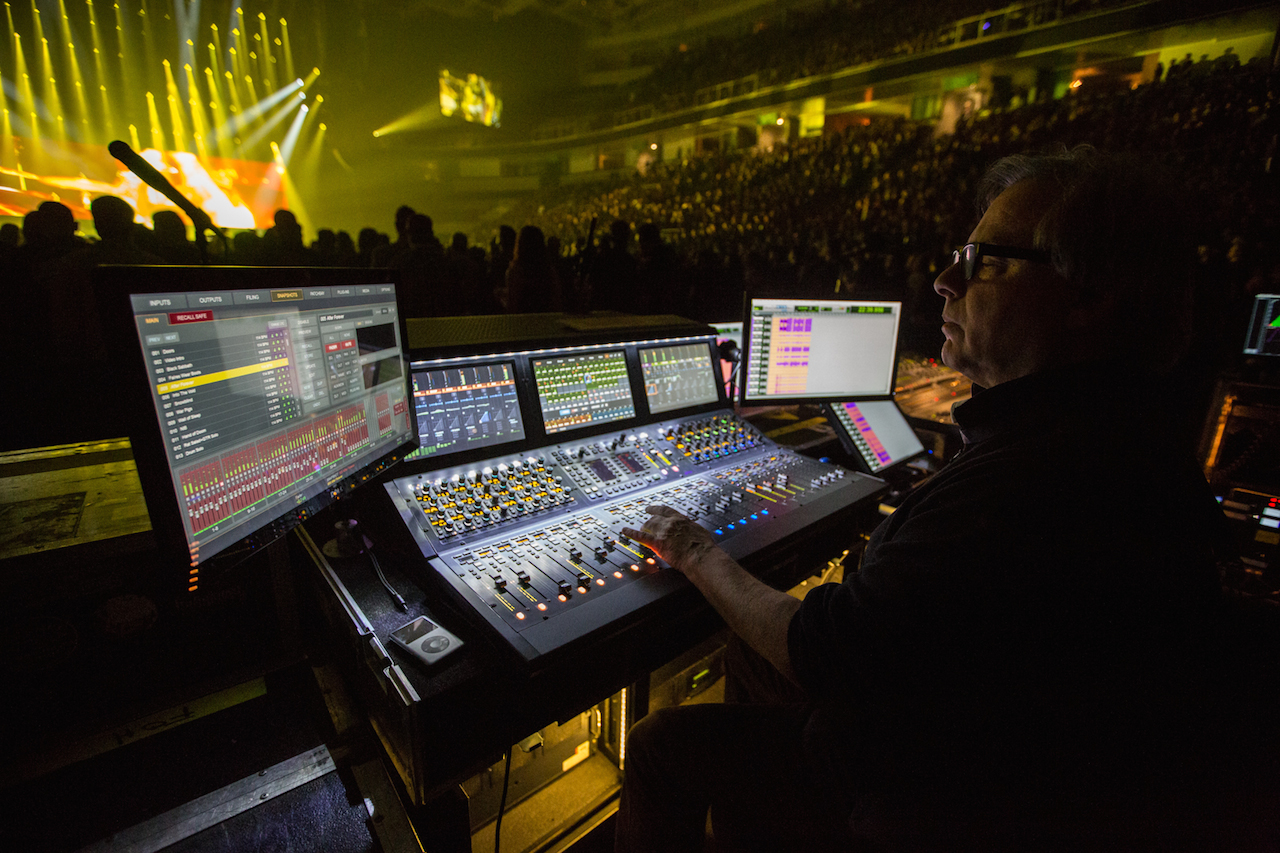
Greg Price mixing Black Sabbath on S6L

Avid released its new flagship VENUE | S6L live sound system in 2015, which effectively replaced earlier D-Show and Profile systems at the top of its live sound range. Although S6L runs VENUE software like earlier systems, it features a new control surface that integrates multiple touch screens and significantly more knobs for faster navigation and editing of parameters than older VENUE systems. S6L also offers much greater processing power, supporting over 300 processing channels and up to 200 plug-in slots. Although its Stage 64 I/O racks borrow from the mechanical design of its predecessors, the I/O was completely redesigned with new high performance preamps and a 96 kHz audio path throughout the system.

The S6L system consists of an S6L control surface (with either 16, 24, or 32 faders), an E6L processing engine, and up to three Stage 64 I/O racks (for up to 192 physical inputs). Like S3L-X, S6L is built on an Ethernet AVB architecture that supports sharing I/O between multiple systems using Avid's True Gain technology (over both Cat5e and fiber cabling). In addition to Ethernet AVB, S6L also supports a new generation of VENUE option cards, including the DNT-192 Dante Card and the MADI-192 MADI Card. Connectivity with Pro Tools is also facilitated over the Ethernet AVB network, with support for up to 128 channels of recording and playback over a single Cat5e cable. S6L natively runs onboard AAX DSP plug-ins from both Avid and 3rd party developers like McDSP, Sonnox and others, while also supporting Waves SoundGrid systems over MADI.

== Common features ==
All Avid consoles create VENUE show files that are inter-compatible. However, due to the architectural differences between systems and numbers of inputs and outputs supported, some files may require edits to fit a new system. While D-Show, Profile, Mix Rack, and SC48 consoles run Windows XP Embedded and use the same TDM plugin architecture as Pro Tools HD, S3L-X uses Avid's newer HDX chipset for its mixing and AAX DSP plug-in processing. The new VENUE | S6L system features a dual engine design that uses a real-time operating system for its core mixing functionality and HDX cards for all onboard AAX DSP plug-in processing. The consoles are all compatible with Pro Tools for recording directly off the console with one cable, and also to enable the 'Virtual Soundcheck' feature, where a recording is played back through the inputs, in effect reducing the need for the band to actually be present for soundcheck.
