= Yamaha M7CL =

Mixing console

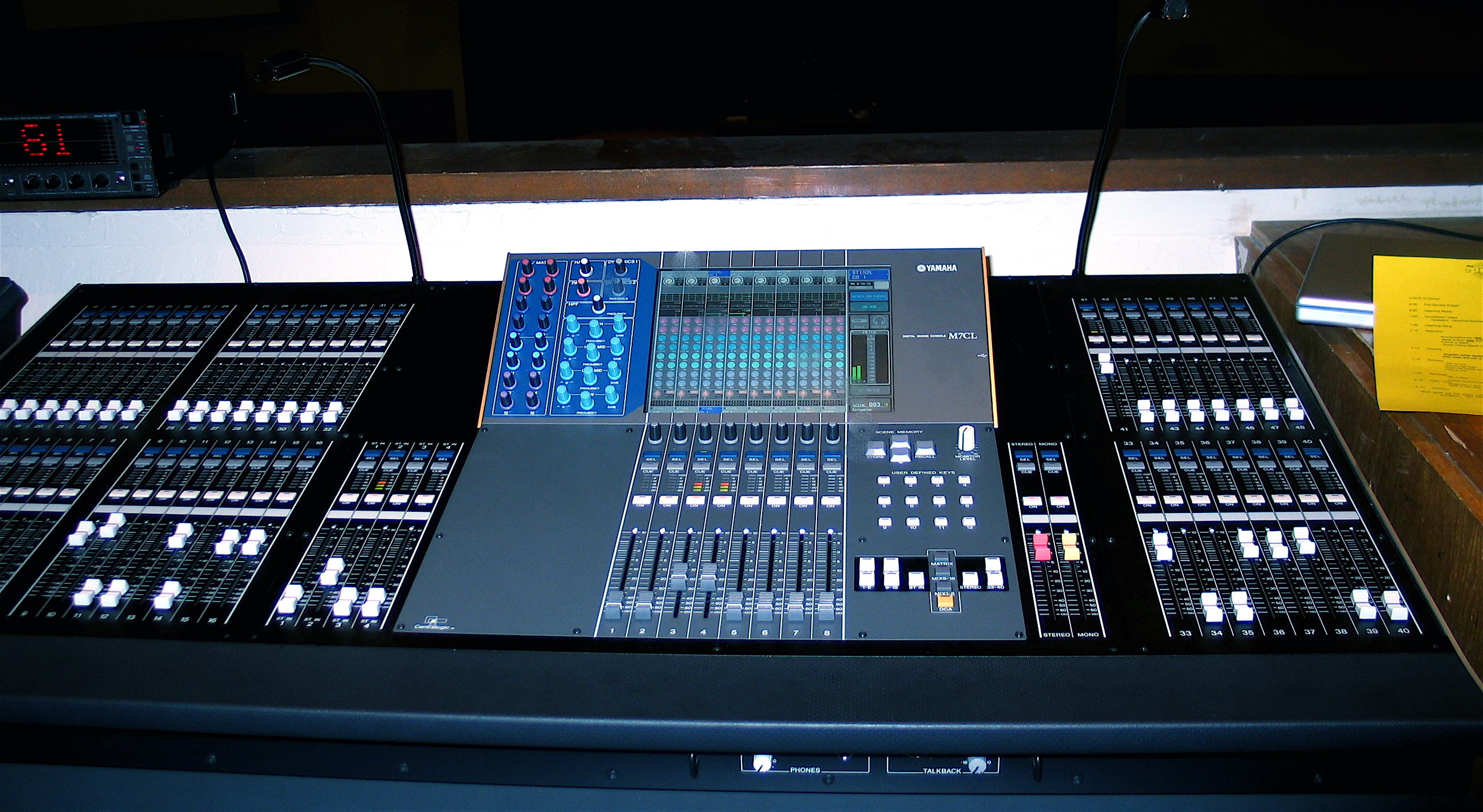
Yamaha M7CL live in production

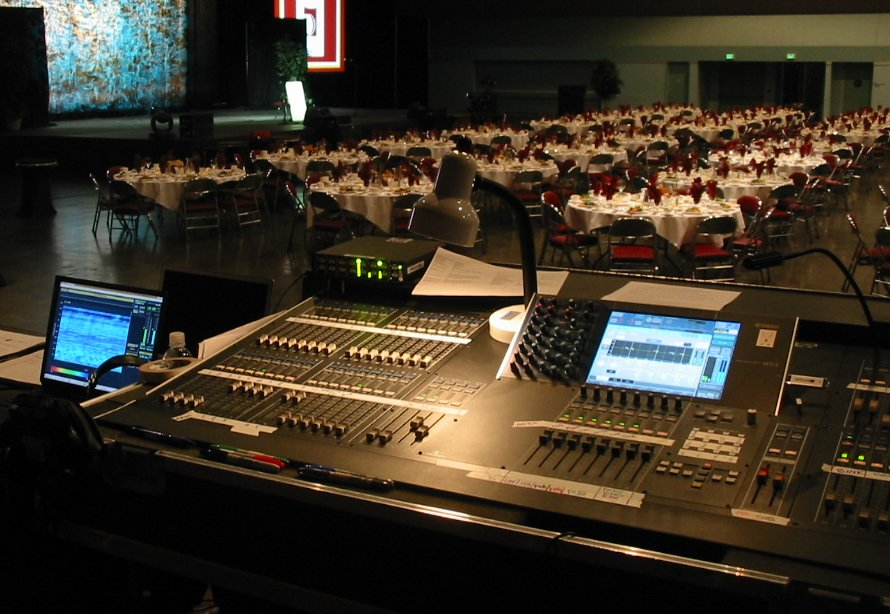
A 48-channel M7CL is readied for a dinner event

The Yamaha M7CL is a digital mixer that was introduced by Yamaha Pro Audio in 2005. Two models with onboard analog input exist: the M7CL-32 and M7CL-48. These models have 40 (32 microphone and 4 stereo line)- and 56 (48 microphone and 4 stereo line)-input channels respectively, counting mono channels. Mixes, masters, groups, DCAs and individual channels can then be routed to an output via any number of the board's 16 configurable output XLR ports. The eight faders of the master control section can control multiple functions by way of "layers" in the same manner as the Yamaha PM5D. The board features Yamaha's "Selected Channel" technology, and Centralogic, unique to the M7CL. It can be augmented with more inputs or outputs via expansion cards, and can be fitted with third-party cards such as ones made by Aviom (A-Net), AuviTran (EtherSound), Audinate (Dante networking), AudioService (MADI), Dan Dugan (automixer), Riedel Communications (RockNet), Waves Audio (SoundGrid interface, DSP plugins), and Optocore (optical network). In 2010, the M7CL-48ES joined the line-up with built-in EtherSound for digital networking using EtherSound stage boxes.

In 2006, the M7CL was recognized at the TEC Awards ceremony for best sound reinforcement console technology. In 2011, a wireless app to control the M7CL with an iPad was nominated but did not win the TEC Award for best wireless technology.

== Features ==
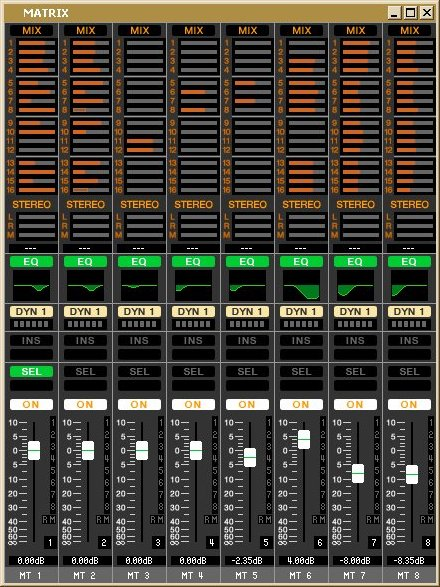
A screenshot of Yamaha's Studio Manager software showing the M7CL's embedded 19×8 matrix mixer section. All 16 mix buses plus the main L/R/Mono buses are routed to 8 matrix outputs. The individual matrix level controls are shown as horizontal bars in dark orange. The 8 matrix outputs are controlled by 8 white faders at the bottom.

=== Selected channel ===
The selected channel interface allows for quick and easy access to every parameter of any channel on the board quickly and easily. Selecting a channel will pull up all available parameters into the Centralogic section for adjustment.

=== Centralogic ===
Centralogic is a technology new and unique to the M7CL. It employs a touch screen, rotary encoders, and faders that dynamically map to whatever function or parameter is selected for adjustment. The control software has only 3 main screens, Overview, Selected Channel, and Effects Rack views. There are no additional layers to navigate through. It is possible to control the mixer from the Centralogic section only and is designed to keep the user at the center section.

=== "Rack" equipment ===
The M7CL features a virtual signal processing "rack" which allows for the use of many different effects or Graphic EQs. Effects are from Yamaha's library of digital effects developed for other digital mixers. Of note is Graphic EQ operation, where the individual bands of EQ can be mapped to faders for precision control.

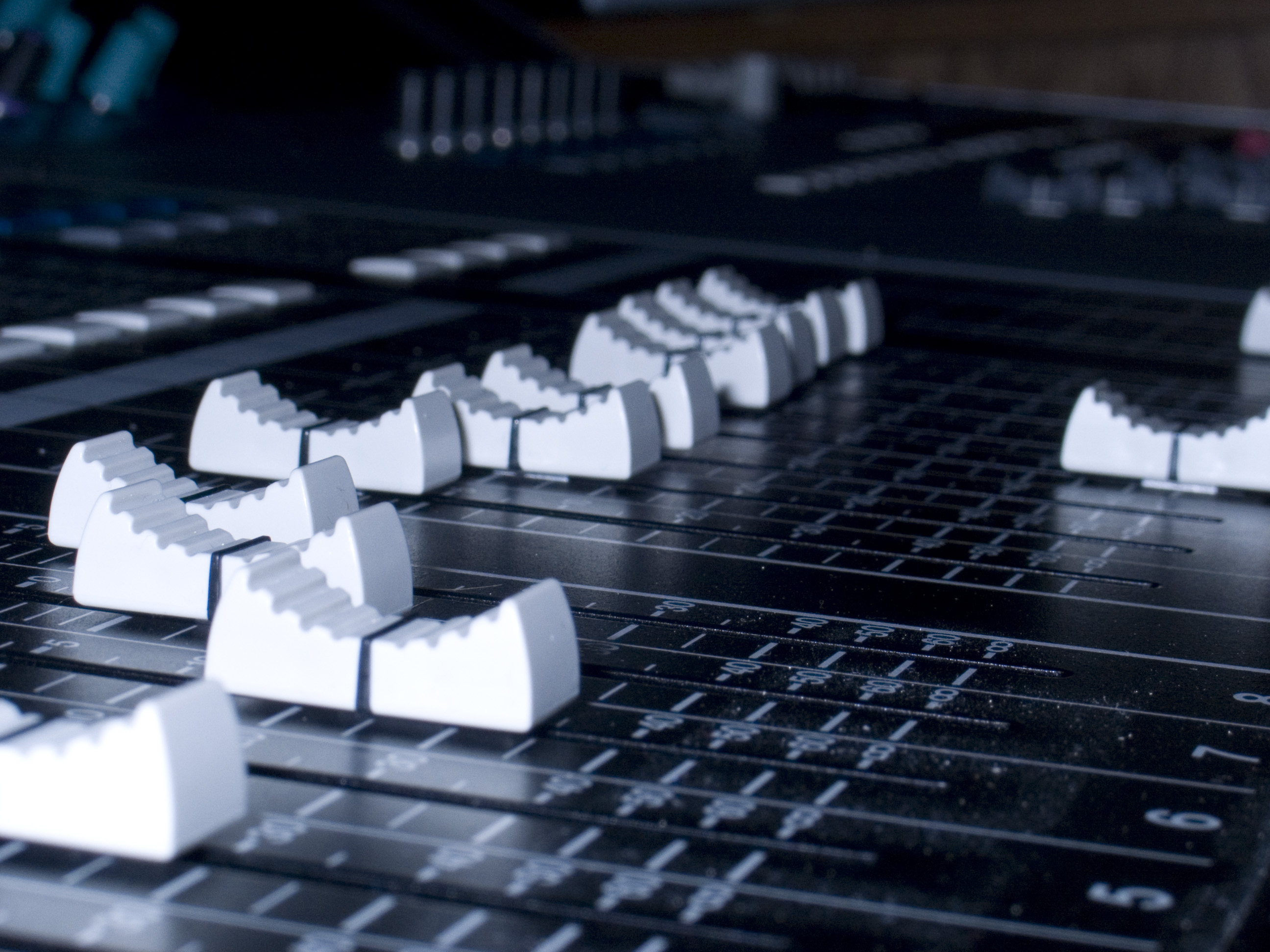
Yamaha M7CL Fader Groups

== Popularity ==
The M7CL became popular in both broadcasting and live sound reinforcement applications. Broadcast companies liked the console primarily for parameter recall, which is useful in daily news broadcasts. Live sound companies often used the mixer for stage monitoring purposes, but have also used it for Front of House environments.

== See also ==
- Sound reinforcement system
