= Whirlwind USA =

American audio equipment manufacturer

- Type: Corporation
- Founded: 1975
- Headquarters: Rochester, New York
- Key people: Michael Laiacona (founder), President
- Products: Pro audio equipment
- Website: www.whirlwindusa.com

Whirlwind USA is a manufacturer of audio interfacing equipment and custom audio interfacing, including digital products that employ the EtherSound standard. In addition, Whirlwind manufactures guitar effects pedals. Whirlwind was founded in 1975 by Michael Laiacona (who cofounded MXR earlier that decade), and its headquarters are located in Rochester, New York.

Whirlwind's EtherSound product, e-Snake, has been the recipient of TEC Awards nominations for Outstanding Technical Achievement.
