= Avid Audio =

American audio equipment company

- Type: Subsidiary
- Industry: Technology
- Founded: 1984; 42 years ago
- Headquarters: Berkeley, California
- Area served: Digital audio production
- Products: Pro Tools, Sibelius, VENUE
- Parent: Avid Technology
- Website: www.avid.com | www.avidder.com

Avid Audio (formerly Digidesign) is an American digital audio technology company. It was founded in 1984 by Peter Gotcher and Evan Brooks. The company began as a project to raise money for the founders' band, selling EPROM chips for drum machines. It is a subsidiary of Avid Technology, and during 2010 the Digidesign brand was phased out. Avid Audio products will continue to be produced and will now carry the Avid brand name.

== Products ==
Digidesign's flagship software product was Pro Tools, which came in three variants: Pro Tools|HD, Pro Tools LE, and Pro Tools M-Powered.

Pro Tools|HD required a Digidesign TDM system and interface, and was intended for professional recording studios. Pro Tools LE was a complete package intended for home users and some post-production facilities. The package included the Pro Tools LE software and hardware such as the M-Box 2 or Digi 003. Pro Tools M-Powered was simply the Pro Tools application adapted to run on M-Audio hardware, and generally comparable in power to an LE system.

In 2010, these various editions of Pro Tools were mostly abandoned and it is now being sold by Avid as a singular software product, with the level of functionality dependent on the hardware chosen by the user.

Digidesign also made a number of products for the Pro Tools platform, including several software plug-ins. They also manufacture a wide variety of hardware add-ons for Pro Tools, such as audio interfaces, MIDI interfaces, Synchronizers, and control surfaces. In the spring of 2005 they introduced a system for live sound mixing called VENUE.

== History ==
Original Digidesign logo

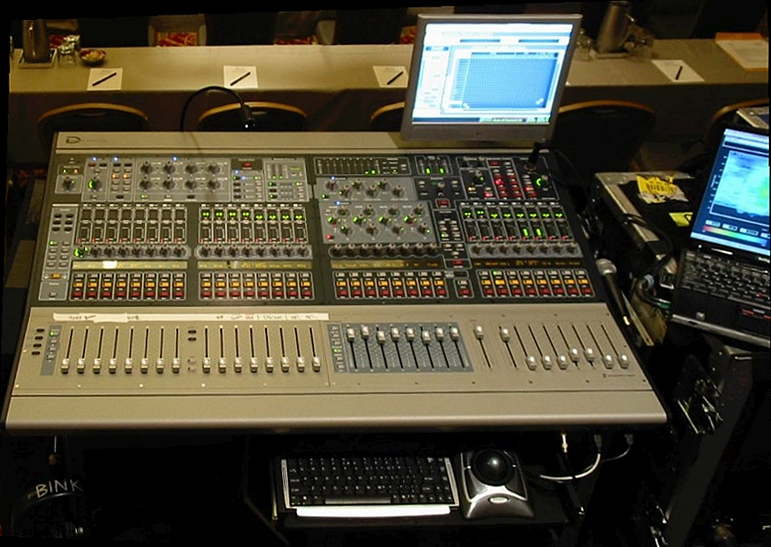
Digidesign D-Show Profile live digital mixer on location at a corporate event

- 1984 - Founded as Digidrums by Peter Gotcher and Evan Brooks. Later became Digidesign.
- 1989 - Digidesign launches the first digital audio workstation system, Sound Tools, for the Apple Macintosh. The company refers to it as "the first tapeless recording studio".
- 1991 - Digidesign releases the first Pro Tools multitrack system, marking a significant advance in digital audio. This integrated software and hardware system (digital audio workstation) is among the most popular for audio production for television, music, and film.
- 1995 - Avid Technology Nasdaq: AVID acquires Digidesign. Digidesign now operates as a business unit of Avid.
- 2001 - Digidesign wins a Grammy award for Pro Tools.
- 2003 - Avid acquires Bomb Factory's extensive product catalog. These products are now included with Pro Tools systems.
- 2003 - Academy of Motion Picture Arts and Sciences recognizes Digidesign's contribution to audio post production for film with an Oscar.
- 2004 - Avid acquires M-Audio, which now operates as a business unit of Digidesign, but maintains the M-Audio brand name and remains largely distinct from Digidesign.
- 2005 - Avid acquires Wizoo, which now operates as Digidesign Advanced Instrument Research Group (A.I.R.), but remains largely autonomous, operating out of Bremen, Germany.
- 2006 - Avid acquires Sibelius, the music software, in a deal worth over US$23 million.
- 2010 - the Digidesign brand name is phased out, with Digidesign products now falling under the Avid product banner.
- 2011 - Digidesign became Avid Audio

=== History of Avid Audio software ===
Audiomedia II and SampleCell II Soundcards

Digidesign Software was developed by UC Berkeley graduate Peter Gotcher and his friend Evan Brooks, both majors in electrical engineering and computer science.

==== Sound Designer ====
The first incarnation of today's Pro Tools started life in 1984 as Sound Designer, while the pair were creating and selling drum sound chips under their Digidrums label. Sound Designer was originally designed to edit sounds for sampling synthesizers like the Prophet 2000, Ensoniq Mirage, Akai s900 and the E-MU Emulator sampling keyboard. Sounds would be sampled into the synth and transferred onto the Mac. Here, the user could manipulate the sample's sound—EQ, amplitude, etc.; truncate to save memory; or set loop points; and then transfer back into the synth for playback. The software was originally written for editing drum samples and then for burning new chips for the LinnDrum era drum machines.

===== Sound Designer file formats =====
The SDII (Sound Designer II, sometimes seen abbreviated as SD2) is a monophonic/stereophonic audio file format, originally developed by Digidesign for their Macintosh-based recording/editing products. It is the successor to the original monophonic Sound Designer I audio file format.

==== Sound Tools ====
Gotcher and Brooks discussed with E-MU Systems the possibility of integrating their renamed 'Sound Tools' software into the Emulator III keyboard released in 1987; however, E-MU rejected this option, and Gotcher and Brooks went on to start DigiDrums.

Sound Tools was debuted at the NAMM Show on January 20, 1989. At this stage, Sound Tools was a simple computer-based stereo audio editor. Although the software had the possibility to do far more, it was limited by the hard drive technology, which was used to stream the audio and allow for the non-destructive editing that Sound Tools offered. Independent public radio producers soon discovered the power and economy of Sound Tools as an alternative to traditional analog tape, sparking the transition to digital program production and distribution in radio.

==== Pro Tools ====
The first version of Pro Tools was launched in 1991, offering four tracks and selling for US$6,000. Digidesign continued to improve Pro Tools, adding a sequencer and more tracks, with the system offering recording at 16-bit and 44.1 kHz. In 1997, Pro Tools had reached 24-bit and 48 track versions. At this point, the migration from more conventional studio technology to the Pro Tools platform took place within the industry.
