= Yamaha Pro Audio =

Professional audio system manufacturer

Yamaha Pro Audio Division

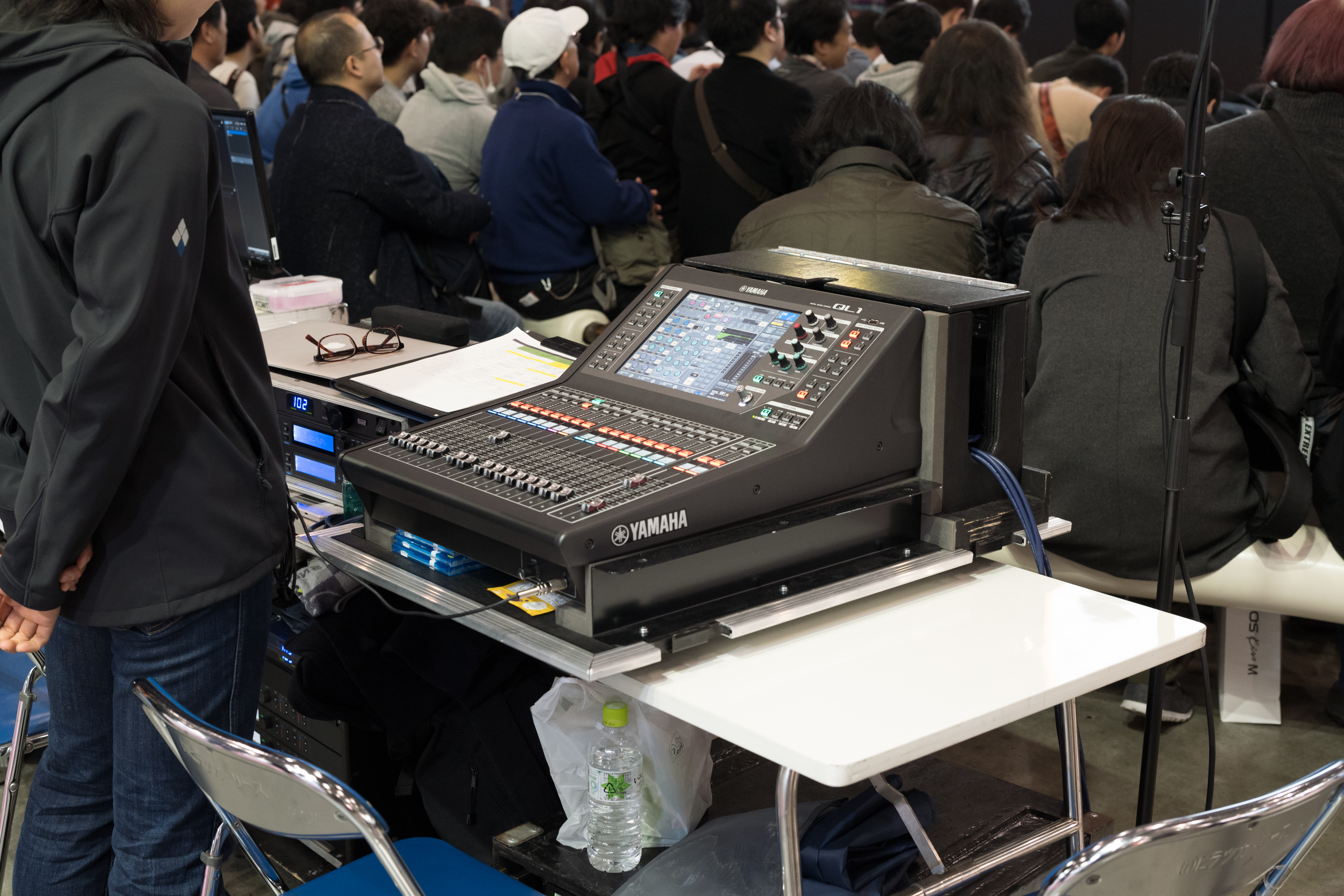
- Type: Subsidiary
- Industry: Professional audiovisual industry
- Headquarters: Hamamatsu, Shizuoka, Japan
- Area served: Worldwide
- Products: Sound bars, headphones, speakers, home theaters, Audio Mixers, Audio Processing, Amplifiers
- Parent: Yamaha Corporation
- Website: www.yamahaproaudio.com

Yamaha Pro Audio, Inc. is the Pro Audio division of Yamaha Corporation that offers a complete line of professional audio products for the live sound and sound reinforcement markets. Their lineup includes mixing consoles, signal processors incorporating DSP technology, power amplifiers based on energy-efficient drive technology, and speakers used for live sound or commercial installations. It has a long history of introducing products for the professional audio market such as the PM-1000 modular mixing console, the REV1 and SPX90 digital signal processors, the NS-10 studio monitors, and the 01v, 02R, 03D, PM1D, PM5D, QL1/5, M7CL, CL1/3/5, PM10/7 Rivage and DM3/5/7 digital mixing consoles.

== History ==
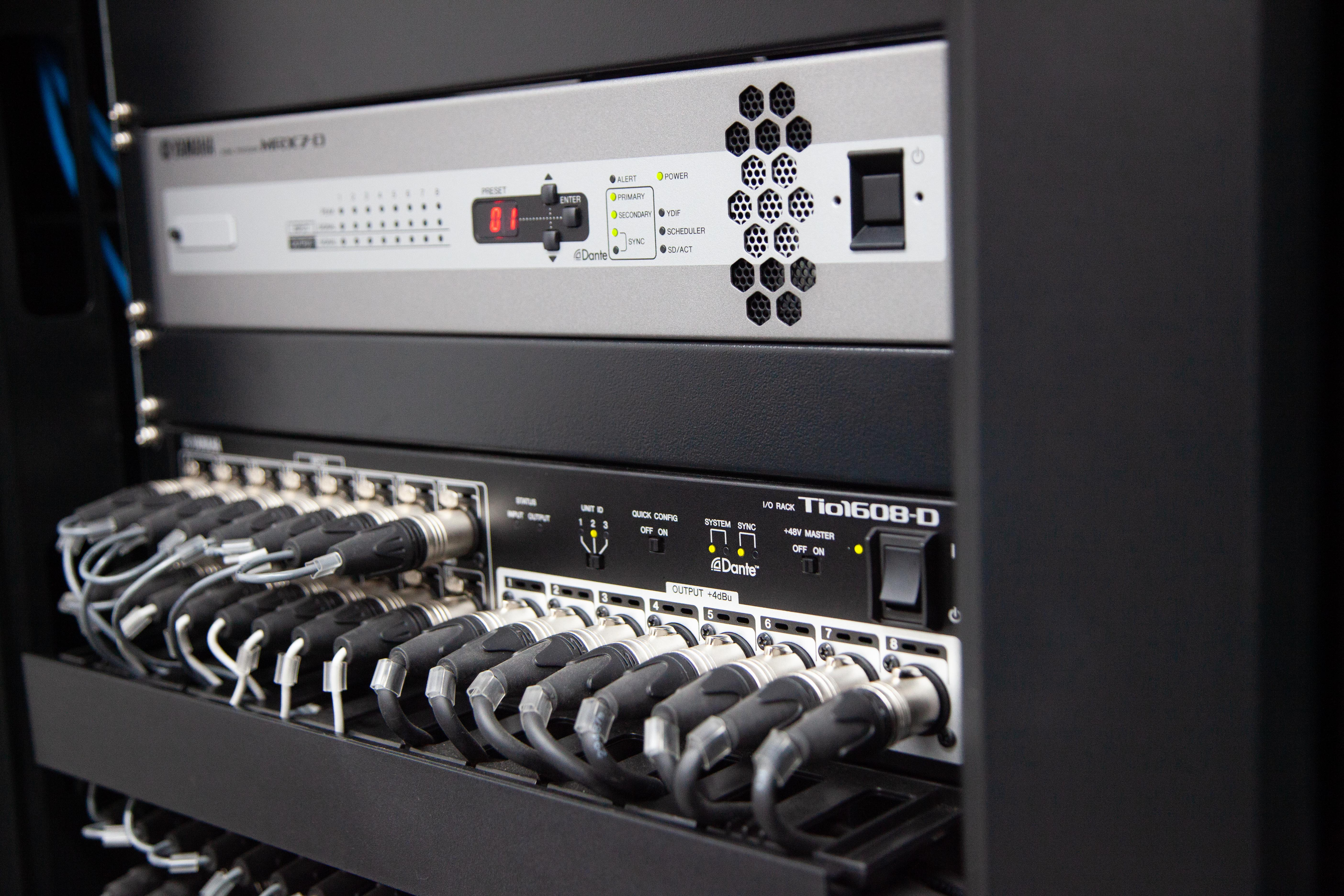
Visita_da_Yamaha_ao_Parque_da_Epopeia_Italiana_(43273830825)

Year	Product
1969	VS60, VS90 Speakers introduced
1972	EM60, EM90, PM200, ES60, ES90 mixers PS75, PS100 speakers introduced
1974	PM1000 modular mixers introduced
1976	P2200 amplifiers introduced
1978	PM2000 mixers introduced
1983	REV1 Signal Processors introduced
1985	SPX90 Signal Processors introduced PM3000 mixers introduced
1986	DMP7 digital mixer introduced
1992	PM4000 mixers introduced
1995	Programmable Mixer 01 and 02R introduced
1997	Digital Mixing Console 03D introduced
2001	PM1D digital mixer introduced
2003	PM5000 mixers introduced
2004	PM5D digital mixer introduced
2005	M7CL (32 and 48) introduced
2012	CL Series introduced
2014	QL Series introduced
2015	TF Series introduced
2016	RIVAGE PM10 introduced
2018	RIVAGE PM7 introduced
2020	RIVAGE PM3 and PM5 introduced
2023	DM3 Series introduced
2023	DM7 Series introduced
2026	MGX Series introduced
2026	DM5 Series introduced

== Products ==
- Mixers
- Interfaces I/O Racks
- Network Switches
- Processors/DSP
- Power Amplifiers
- Speakers
- PA Systems
- DAW Systems
- Microphone Systems
- Live Streaming / Gaming
- Headphones
- CD Players
- Active Field Control
- Software for creating sound design
- Accessories for PA products.

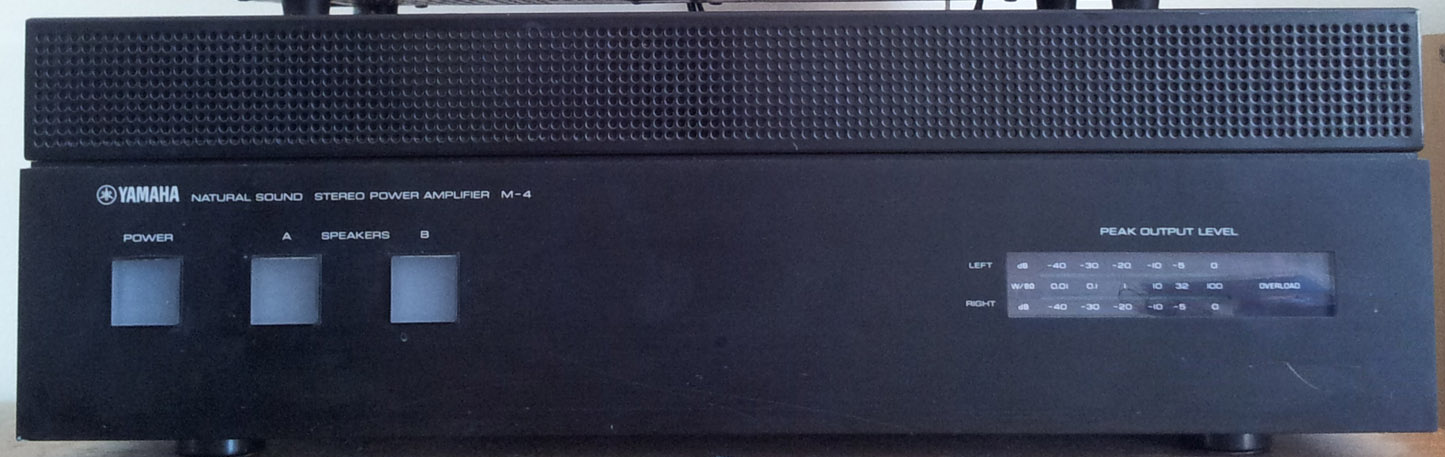
Yamaha M-4 Power amp

Applications

- Live Sound & Event Production
- Installed Sound Reinforcement
- Distributed Audio & Public Address
- Conferencing & Collaboration
- Learning
- Content Production & Streaming

Markets

- Touring & Live Production
- Live Events
- Live Venues
- Performing Arts Center & Theater
- House of Worship
- Broadcast
- Hospitality
- Retail & Commercial Space
- Corporate
- Government
- Education
- Band & Musician

Yamaha Pro Audio products have also received the most nominations in the area of technical achievement in the TEC Foundation TEC Awards 20-year history.

=== The PM series of analog mixing consoles ===
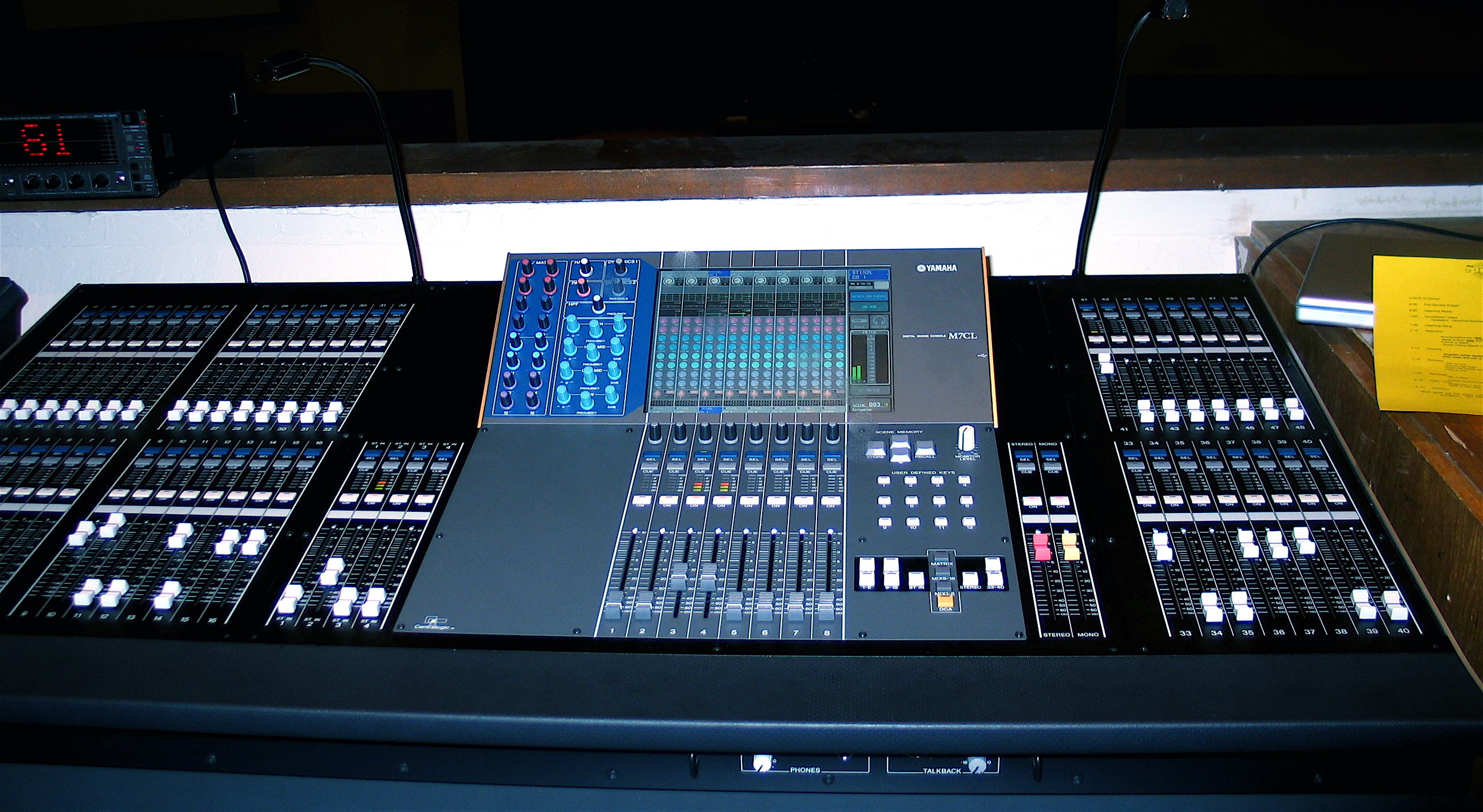
Yamaha M7CL (2005)

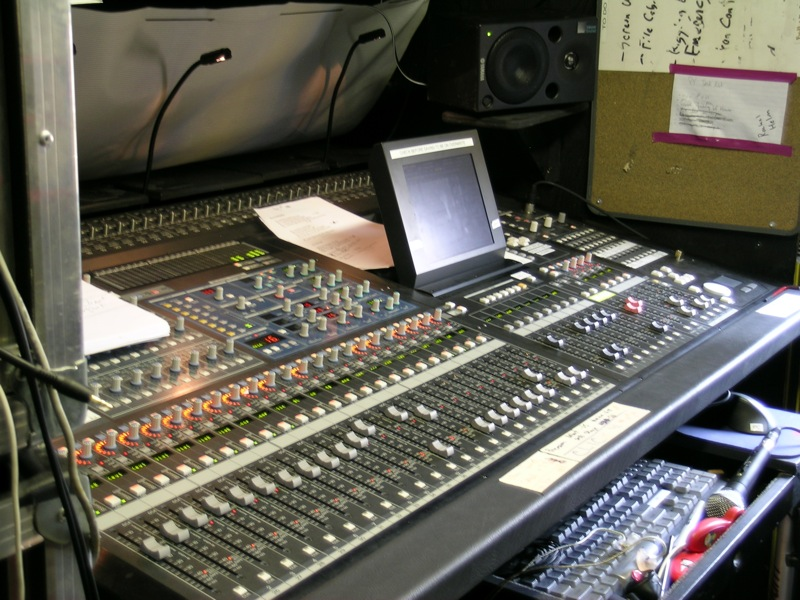
Yamaha PM5D digital mixing console (2004)

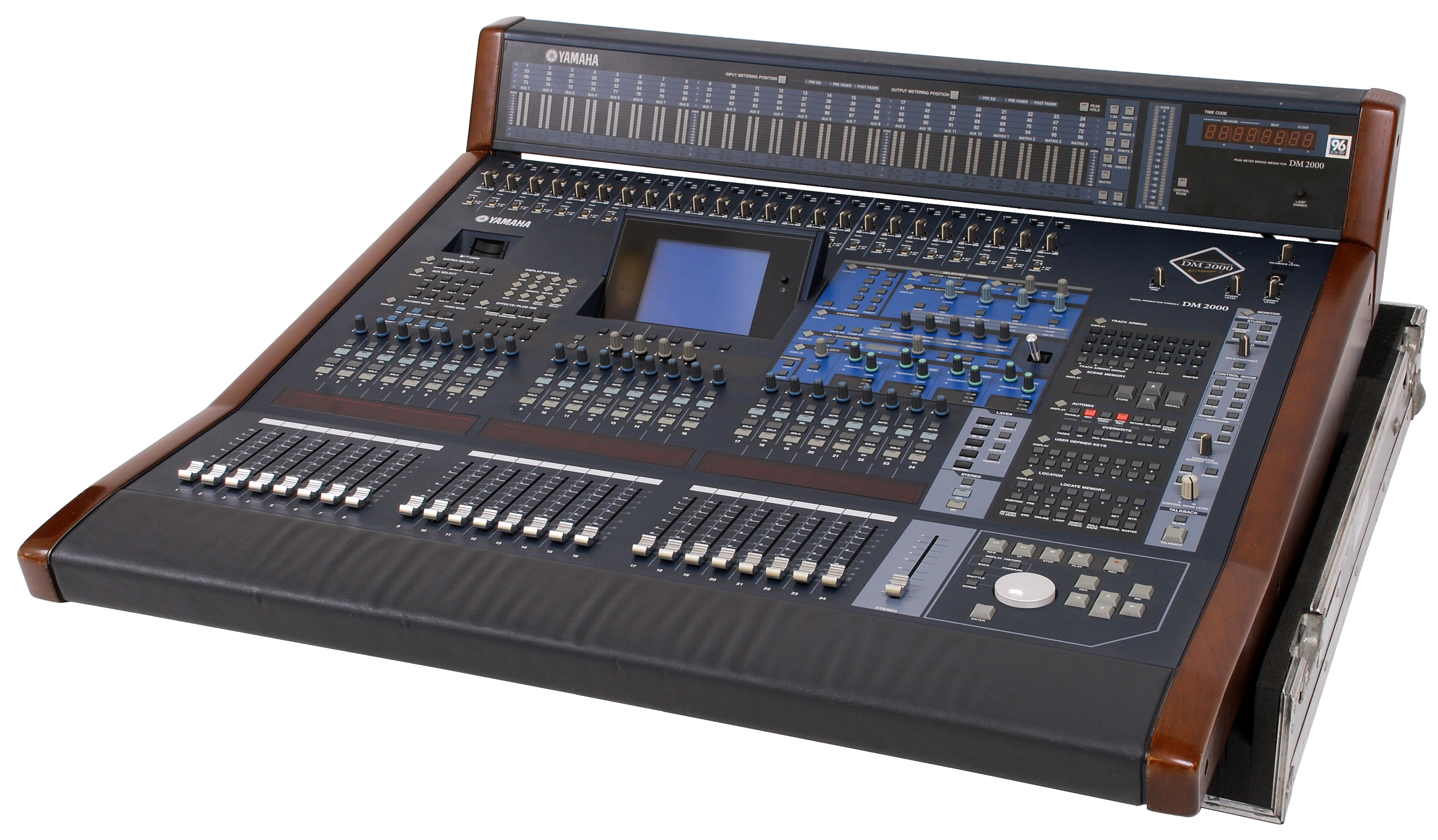
Yamaha DM2000V2

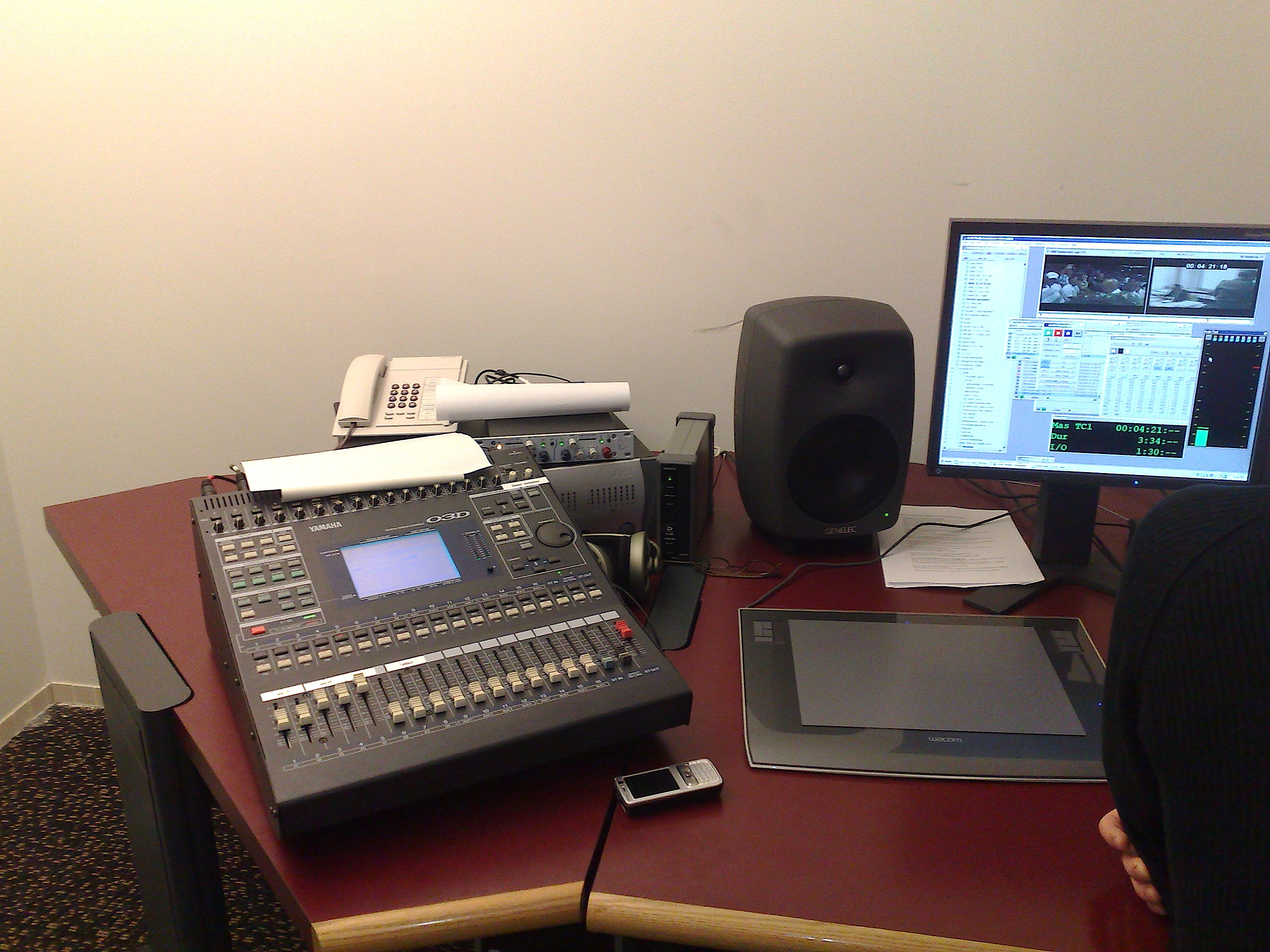
Yamaha 03D

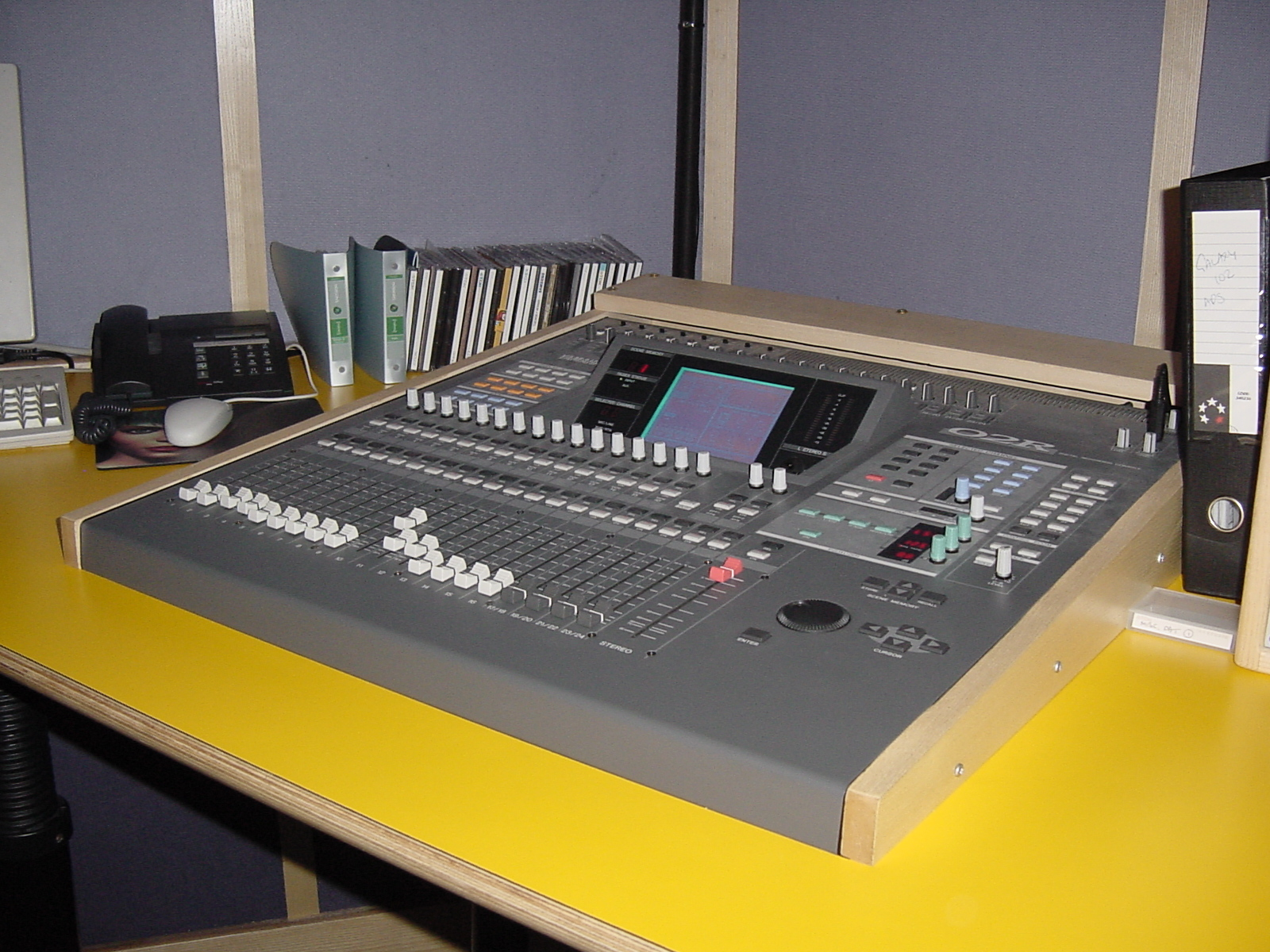
Yamaha 02R

The first PM mixer manufactured by Yamaha was the PM200. Introduced in 1972, it was a monaural mixer with unbalanced inputs and outputs

The PM400 was an upgraded mixer with a stereo bus and balanced inputs and outputs.

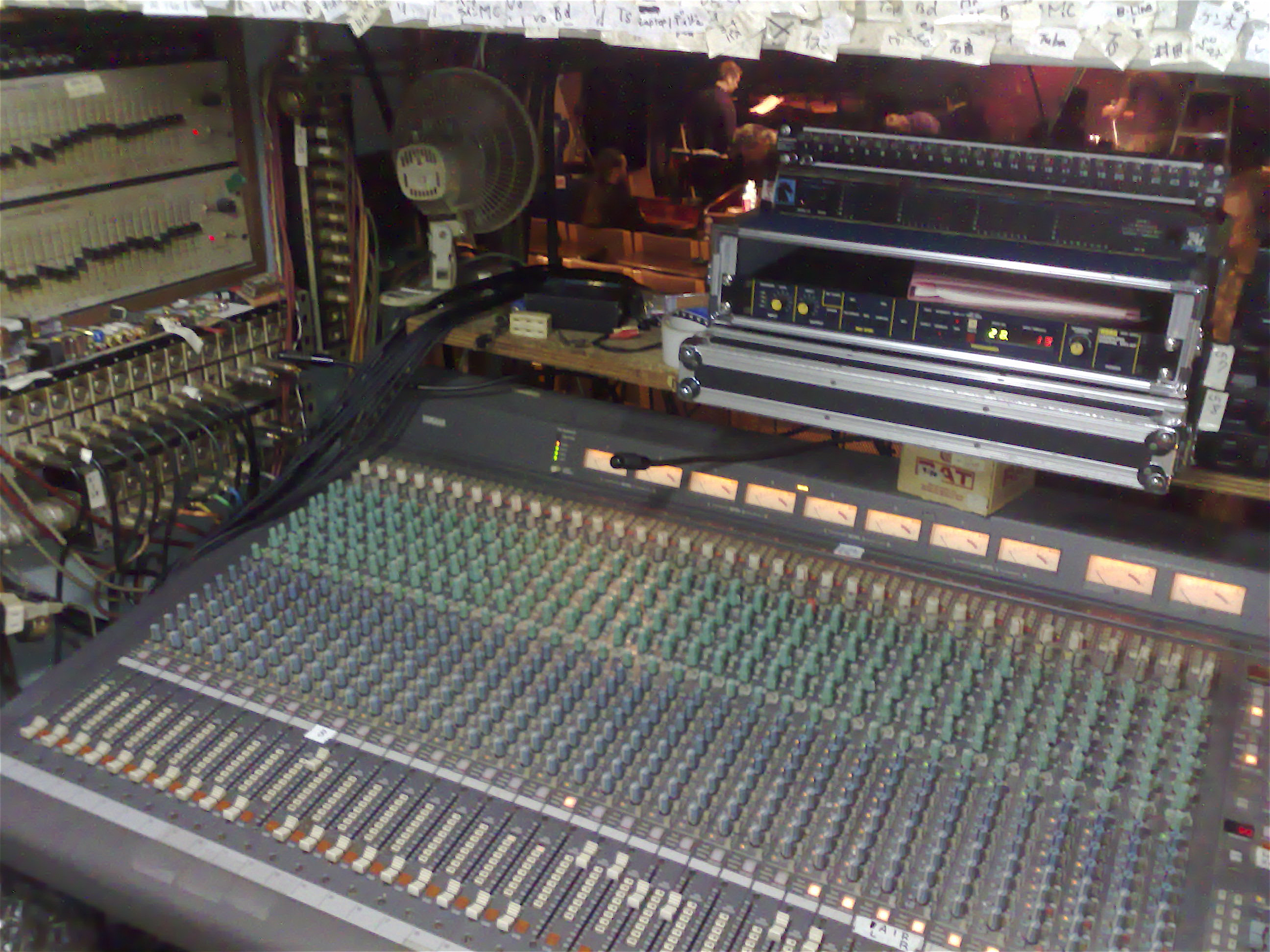
Yamaha PM3500/40

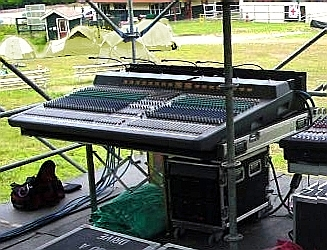
Yamaha PM4000

The Yamaha PM1000 mixing console was a significant product in the professional audio industry because of its many advanced features and reasonable price. Introduced in 1974 it incorporated many innovative features such as a modular design using channel strips and output strips, a 4 bus design, and an output matrix mixer. Because it was manufactured by an established company it was readily accepted in many audio industries including sound reinforcement, recording, and audio for video. It also established a reputation for being rugged in the often abusive environment of touring sound reinforcement.

The PM2000 featured a hard chassis construction for rigidity and durability on the road.

"One of the tests we are still using is our 'flight case test'. During prototyping we order a custom flight case - not even a very sturdy one - and place the console in it. The flight case is stood on end, and then tipped over in both directions and allowed to fall to the floor. If the console powers up immediately and works flawless after that ordeal, then it passes the test."

The PM3000 was the first mixer to use voltage-controlled amplifiers (VCAs) in a mixer designed specifically for sound reinforcement. It used a custom VCA design using discrete hybrid ICs

The PM4000 introduced stereo auxiliary buses and fully parametric Equalization on the input channels.

The PM5000 was a hybrid analog mixer with a digital control system which provided scene recall.

In 1999, Yamaha debuted a first of its kind, all digital large format console, The PM1D system. With scalable I/O configuration the total channel count could be brought up to 320 mic inputs. Though, to achieve this impressive channel count, the system required multiple modular I/O boxes along with separate Digital Signal Processor(DSP) racks, power supply racks, and computer system engines.

Yamaha's next desk, the PM5D did away with the external rack system, reducing the channel count to 48 mic pres, and requiring only an external power supply unit.

The Yamaha PM5D-RH(remote head-amp) was all of the functionality of a PM5D in a 10 space rack that only required a PM5D-RH control surface.

In 2007, Yamaha won a Technical Grammy for its NS-10 studio monitor, a speaker that dominated the mixing of pop and rock music throughout the world for at least 20 years. The speaker was inducted into the Mix magazine TECnology Hall of Fame in 2008.

The M7CL console was launched in 2005 and the LS9 in 2006.

The CL Series and the smaller QL series were launched in 2012 and 2014, and were the first digital audio consoles to incorporate the Dante protocol.

In 2014, Yamaha announced the release of a new PM series digital console, the PM10 Rivage system, equipped with Rupert Neve Designed "Silk" modeling pre-amps.

== See also ==
- List of phonograph manufacturers
