= Matrix mixer =

Audio device that routes multiple audio signals

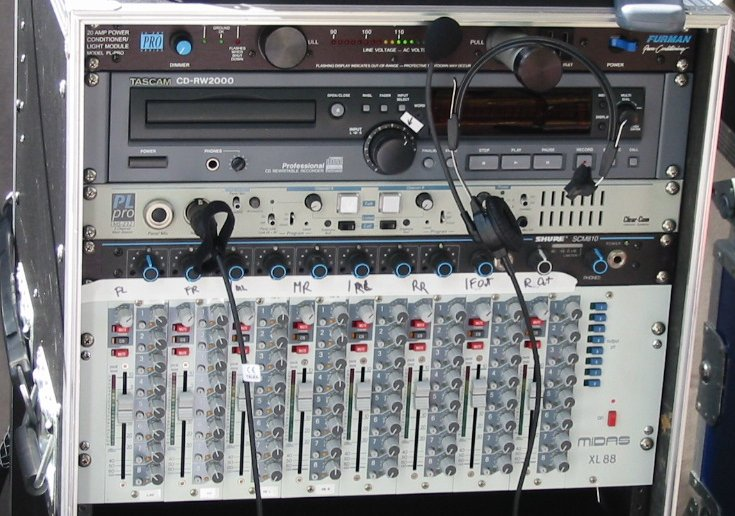
A 19-inch rack holding several professional audio devices including an 8×8 matrix mixer at the bottom, made by Midas Consoles. The matrix mixer has 8 vertical faders to control output level, 8 light gray potentiometers (rotating pots) for input level control, and 64 dark gray pots for matrix mixing. There are also 64 on/off buttons, one for each input/output intersection.

A matrix mixer is an audio electronics device that routes multiple input audio signals to multiple outputs. It usually employs level controls such as potentiometers to determine how much of each input is going to each output, and it can incorporate simple on/off assignment buttons. The number of individual controls is at least the number of inputs multiplied by the number of outputs.

Matrix mixers may be incorporated into larger devices such as mixing consoles or they may be a standalone product. They always have routing and level controls and may also include other features. Matrix mixers are often used in a complex listening space to send audio signals to different loudspeaker zones. They may be used to provide the producer or director different blends of a mixing project for television, film or recording studio.

== Basics ==
In professional audio, a matrix mixer is used to route audio signals from multiple sources to different destinations. It may be a standalone device or embedded within another, larger product such as a mixing console, digital audio workstation or digital signal processor.

An analog matrix mixer contains a number of simple electronic mixer circuits, the quantity being the number of inputs multiplied by the number of outputs. Each electronic mixer controls the level (gain) of one input going to one output. The level control is usually a rotating potentiometer (called a "pot"). Each row of electronic mixer circuits, one from each input, feeds a summing amplifier or combining amp at the output. A fader (a linear potentiometer) may be used to control the level of each output signal. Other controls may include a mute button for each input/output intersection, a mute button for each input, a mute button for each output, and buttons that invert the input signal polarity. The output signals of the matrix mixer may be digital, or they may be balanced or unbalanced analog. It is possible in a matrix mixer to combine an all-analog signal path with digital control of level.

Any audio console that lacks a matrix section may be connected to an external matrix mixer. Many audio manufacturers have produced matrixes incorporating digital signal processing (DSP) which offers additional tools such as compression, equalization, ducking, gating, and loudspeaker system management.

== Live sound ==
In live sound mixing the front of house mixing console often includes a matrix mixer section for optimizing the blend of sound going to various locations in the performance space. Subgroups, auxiliary mixes, submixes or even the main outputs are routed through the matrix mixer to different loudspeaker zones, making the matrix essentially a "mix of mixes". A front-of-house matrix may be used at a concert to switch between the headliner's and the opening act's mixing consoles. A matrix mixer feature may be included on analog or digital consoles. For instance, the Midas Consoles XL4 concert mixing console has a built-in 8×8 matrix summing 8 subgroups into 8 matrix outputs; the same basic module is available separately as the Midas XL88 (see photograph). The digital Yamaha M7CL mixing console is another such product; it has a 19×8 matrix section summing 16 mixes as well as the main left/right/mono outputs (see screenshot). In the classic analog monitor mixer without faders, the console is set up as a large matrix mixer with the addition of equalization filters and other controls for each input.

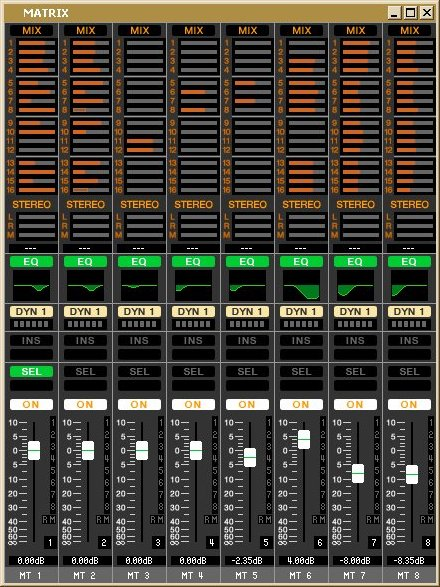
Yamaha M7CL 19×8 matrix section, showing the 16 mix buses plus the main L/R/Mono buses routed to 8 matrix outputs. The individual level controls are shown as horizontal bars in dark orange. The 8 matrix outputs are controlled by 8 white faders at the bottom.

The matrix mixer is useful for performance spaces with multiple loudspeaker zones such as main left and right loudspeaker arrays, a center loudspeaker cluster or array, under-balcony speakers for the rear seating area, stage-lip loudspeakers for the front seats, overflow rooms, green rooms, the foyer, and broadcast or live streaming to distant audiences. If there is no separate monitor mixer with its own operator, the matrix mixer could be used to send a different blend to stage monitors or sidefill loudspeakers. However, such a use of the matrix is limited by the likelihood that the musicians on stage would be disturbed by any changes made to the channel levels by the front of house operator. It is usually better to supply stage monitors with signal obtained from pre-fader auxiliary sends. Listeners outside of the main performance space will not hear amplified instruments such as electric guitar as well as those inside, so the matrix output going to their location would typically contain more of the amplified instruments. Also, the matrix may be used to send a different blend to any recording devices, especially a blend that is optimized for stereo playback whereas the live sound for the performance space may be presented in mono. The matrix mixer may be used to combine the main mix with audience ambiance microphones to obtain a more "live" blend for the recording mix.

== Recorded sound ==
In the process of mixing for film or television, a matrix mixer may be used to give the film director, television director or producer a working mix of the project while the mix engineer puts it together. In the recording studio, the same method may be used to give the record producer a different blend during the mixing process. The matrix mixer may have also been used to route various audio input channels to specific recording channels.

== See also ==
- Matrix decoder, for expanding playback channels to a larger number of loudspeaker channels
- Microphone practice, in which matrixing may be used to produce a mono-compatible stereo image
- Merged stereo, stereo sound channels in a single signal path
