= Aviom =

American audio equipment manufacturer

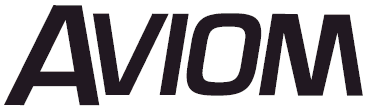
- Company type: Private
- Founded: 2002; 24 years ago
- Headquarters: West Chester, Pennsylvania, US
- Key people: Carl Bader (CEO)
- Products: Monitor mixers, audio networking equipment, audio distribution equipment
- Number of employees: 60
- Website: http://www.aviom.com/

Aviom is a pro audio equipment manufacturer of personal monitoring systems. Headquartered in West Chester, Pennsylvania, Aviom produces distributed audio networking gear which uses a proprietary digital audio transport system called A-Net, based on the physical layer of Ethernet and carried over Category 5 cables terminated with 8P8C connectors. Aviom's Pro16 Monitor Mixing System was nominated in 2005 for a TEC Award, and in 2008 the Pro64 Series won the best Sound System Technology at Musik Messe in Frankfurt, Germany.

Aviom's products are used in live sound, broadcast, recording studios, houses of worship, theaters, schools, and post-production facilities worldwide. Applications include interfacing with stage monitoring, headphone monitoring, and in-ear monitoring. House-of-worship engineer Brad Herring wrote that, of the several CAT-5e-based personal monitoring systems entering the marketplace, "perhaps the most notable is the Aviom system."

== Users ==
- At the 2007 MTV Video Music Awards, Aviom's MH10f Fiber Merger Hub was used to transport broadcast audio signals, making its debut. The hub was connected to existing Pro64 Series Aviom products already installed at the Palms Casino Resort.
- Country music artist Luke Bryan used Aviom microphone preamps, the model 6416m, on tour beginning early 2010. The Aviom preamps took the place of Yamaha M7CL preamps, using expansion card slots. Band engineer Chris "Sully" Sullivan reported that band members who were previously unsatisfied with the M7CL preamps expressed happiness with the Aviom sound.

== Gallery ==
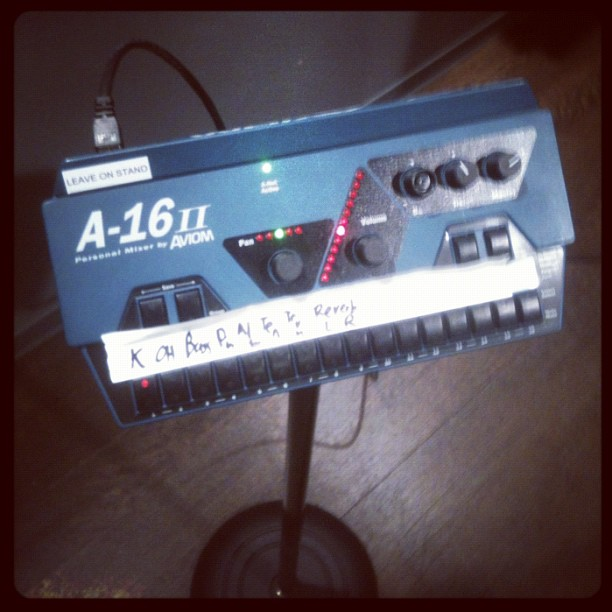
Aviom A-16II
Personal Mixer

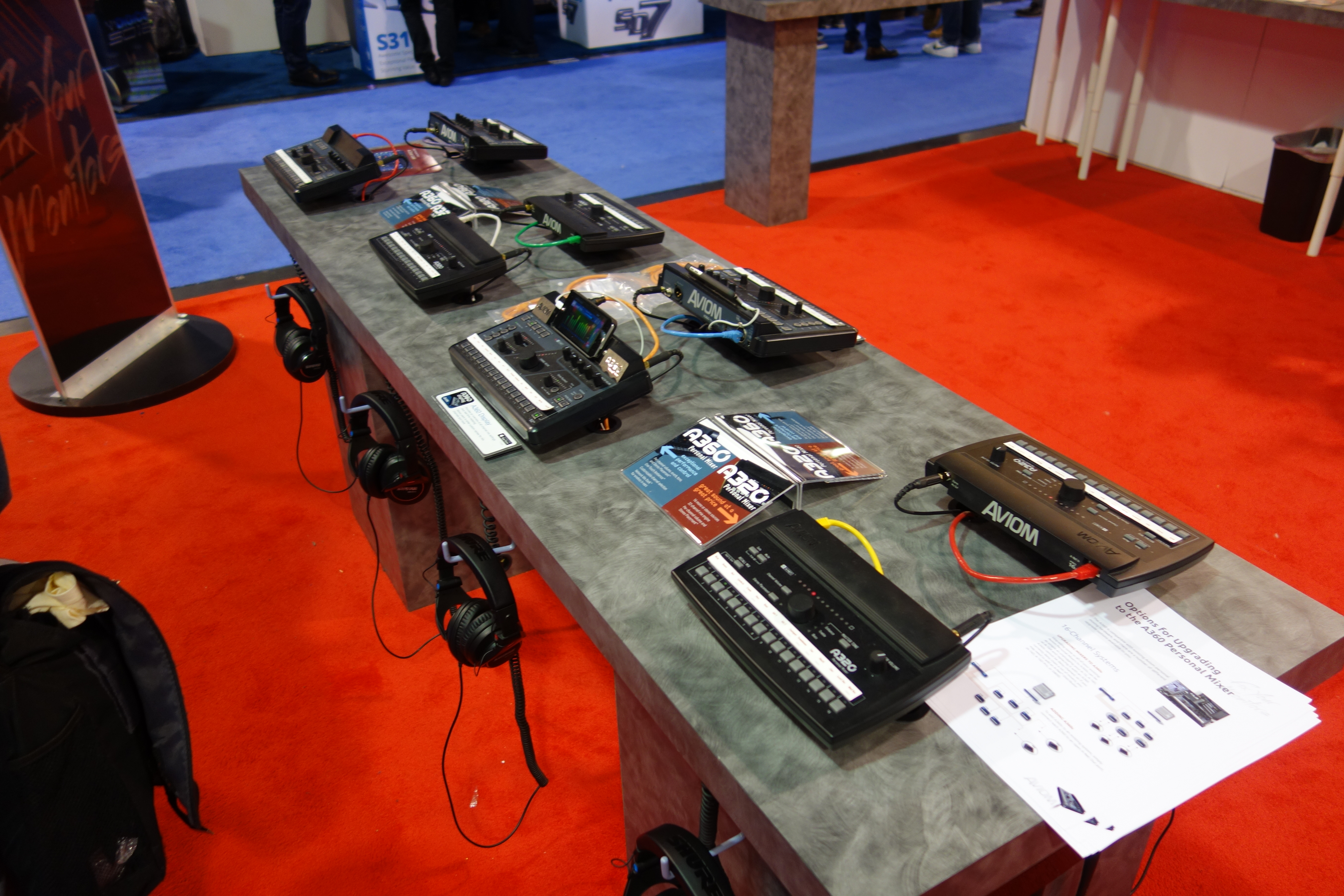
Aviom's products
(2017 NAMM Show)

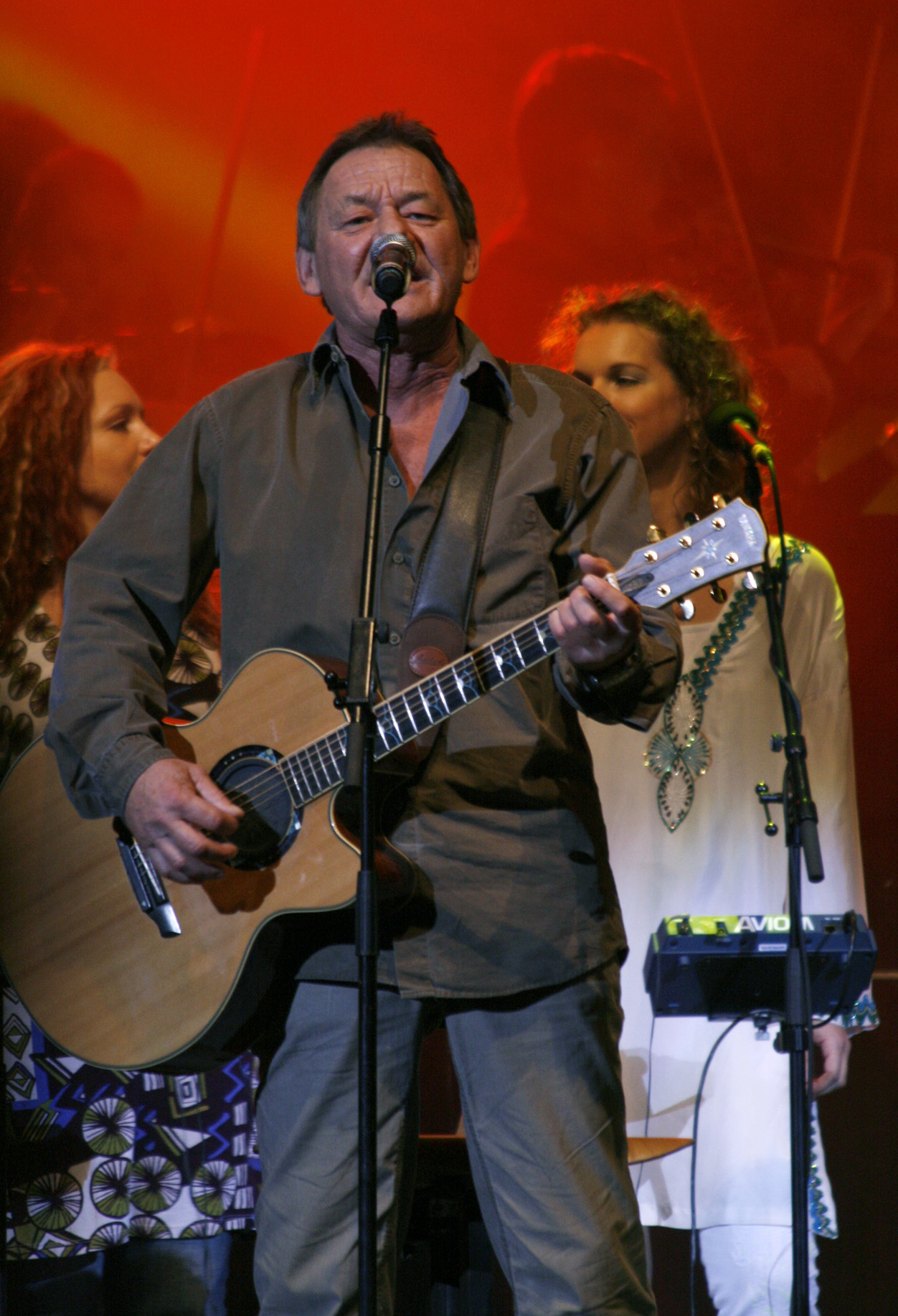
Wolfgang Ambros with Aviom

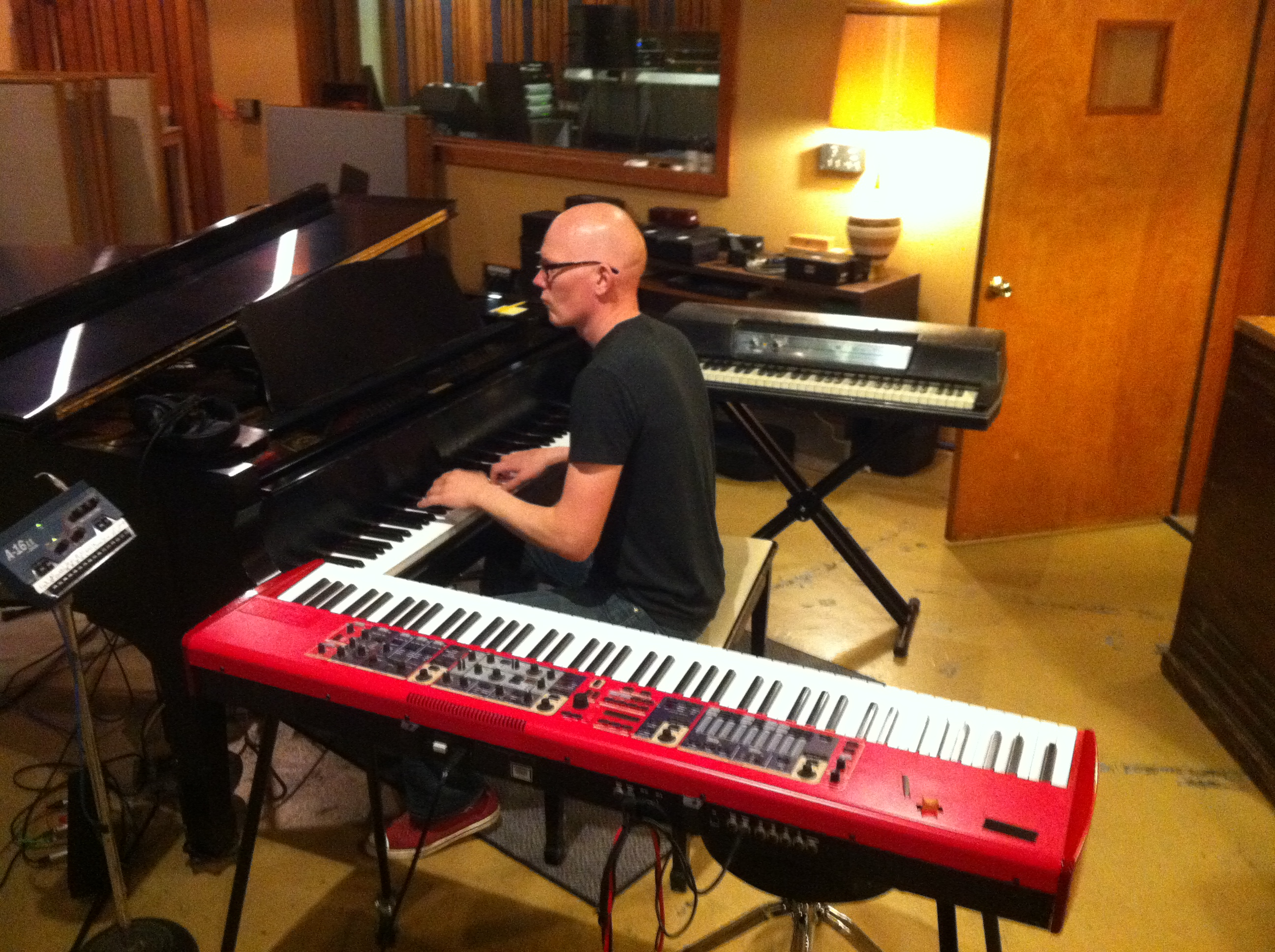
Daniel Spils (Maktub) on keyboards rig with Aviom
