= Dante (networking) =

Real-time professional audio over IP networking

Manufacturer info
- Manufacturer: Audinate Pty. Ltd.
- Development date: 2006; 20 years ago

Network compatibility
- Switchable: Yes
- Routable: Yes (Note: Although the UDP packets used for encapsulation of audio are routable, the multicast DNS discovery protocol used by Dante does not traverse routers without special provisions.)
- Ethernet data rates: Fast Ethernet, Gigabit Ethernet

Audio specifications
- Minimum latency: 150 μs
- Maximum channels per link: 1024 (512x512)
- Maximum sampling rate: 192 kHz
- Maximum bit depth: 32 bits

Dante is the product name for a combination of software, hardware, and network protocols that delivers uncompressed, multi-channel, low-latency digital audio over a standard Ethernet network using Layer 3 IP packets. Developed in 2006 by the Sydney-based Audinate, Dante builds on previous audio over Ethernet and audio over IP technologies.

Like most other audio over Ethernet technologies, Dante is primarily for professional, commercial applications. Most often, it is used in applications where a large number of audio channels must be transmitted over relatively long distances or to multiple locations.

Digital audio provides several advantages over traditional analog audio distribution. Audio transmitted over analog cables can be adversely affected by signal degradation due to electromagnetic interference, high-frequency attenuation, and voltage drop over long cable runs. Thanks to digital multiplexing, the cabling requirements for digital audio distribution are almost always reduced when compared to analog audio. Dante also provides specific advantages over first-generation audio over Ethernet technologies, such as CobraNet and EtherSound. Technological advancements include native gigabit support, higher channel count, lower latency, and automatic configuration.

== History ==
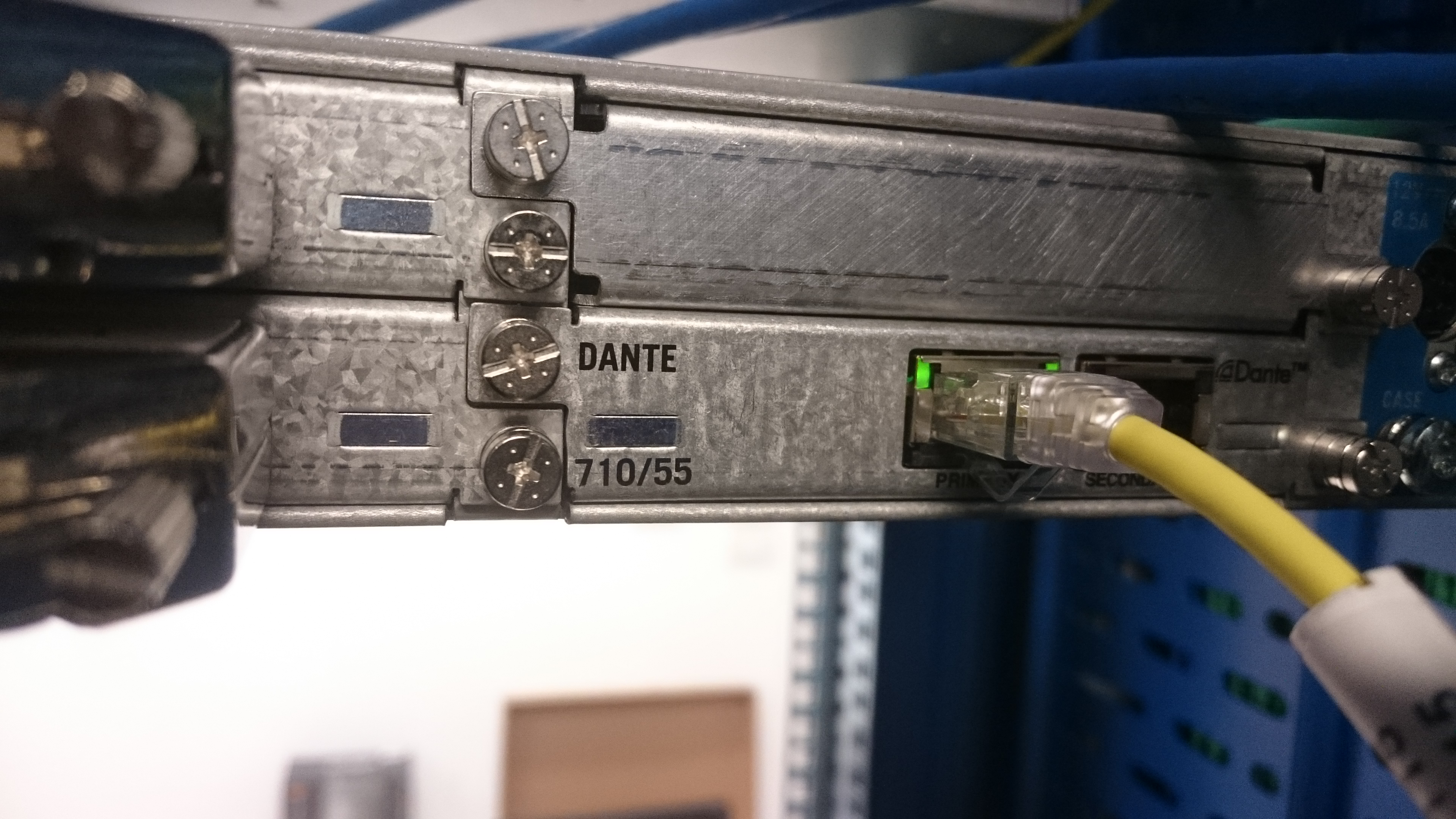
A Dante interface card installed in a sound mixer by Lawo

After Motorola closed an Australian research facility in 2003, current Audinate CEO Aidan Williams brought a team of researchers to the National Information and Communication Technology Australia (NICTA) research centre in Sydney, Australia. There, with the help of government funding, the team spent three years developing the foundations of Dante. In 2006, Williams founded Audinate and began the process of bringing Dante to the market.

The first implementation of Dante was in the Dolby Lake processor which was being developed by Bruce Jackson.

Audinate received funding from NICTA until negotiations concluded in 2006, at which point Audinate became NICTA's first successful spin-out company. Since 2006, Audinate has also secured two rounds of A$4 million investments led by venture capital firms Starfish Ventures and Innovation Capital. In 2009, Audinate established an office in Portland, Oregon and also has offices in Cambridge, UK and Hong Kong.

As of March 2021 Audinate has licensed 350 companies, which have produced over 3000 products that incorporate Dante technology.

As of September 2023 Audinate has licensed 550 companies, which have produced over 3800 products that incorporate Dante technology.

== Platforms ==
Audinate offers Dante technology on a number of hardware and software platforms.

- Dante Virtual Soundcard – software for Windows and macOS that emulates a sound card and speaks Dante from the compter's network adapter
- Dante Controller – Dante network software controller for Windows and macOS
- Brooklyn II – medium channel count module, Gigabit Ethernet
- Ultimo – low channel count microcontroller, Fast Ethernet
- Dante HC – high channel count FPGA, Gigabit Ethernet
- Broadway – low channel count FPGA, Gigabit Ethernet
- Dante Studio – Dante AV ingest bridge for Windows and macOS AV applications
- Dante Domain Manager – network management platform
- Dante Director – Cloud-based SaaS remote management platform

Third-party software and hardware companies that sell Dante solutions must license it from Audinate.

== See also ==
- Audio Video Bridging – Specifications for synchronized, low-latency streaming
