= EtherSound =

Audio-over-Ethernet technology

Manufacturer info
- Manufacturer: Digigram
- Development date: 2002; 24 years ago

Network compatibility
- Switchable: No (Note: Audio may only be passed unidirectionally through a hub or switch.)
- Routable: No
- Ethernet data rates: Fast Ethernet, Gigabit Ethernet

Audio specifications
- Minimum latency: 125 μs
- Maximum channels per link: 512 (256 each direction)
- Maximum sampling rate: 192 kHz
- Maximum bit depth: 24 bits

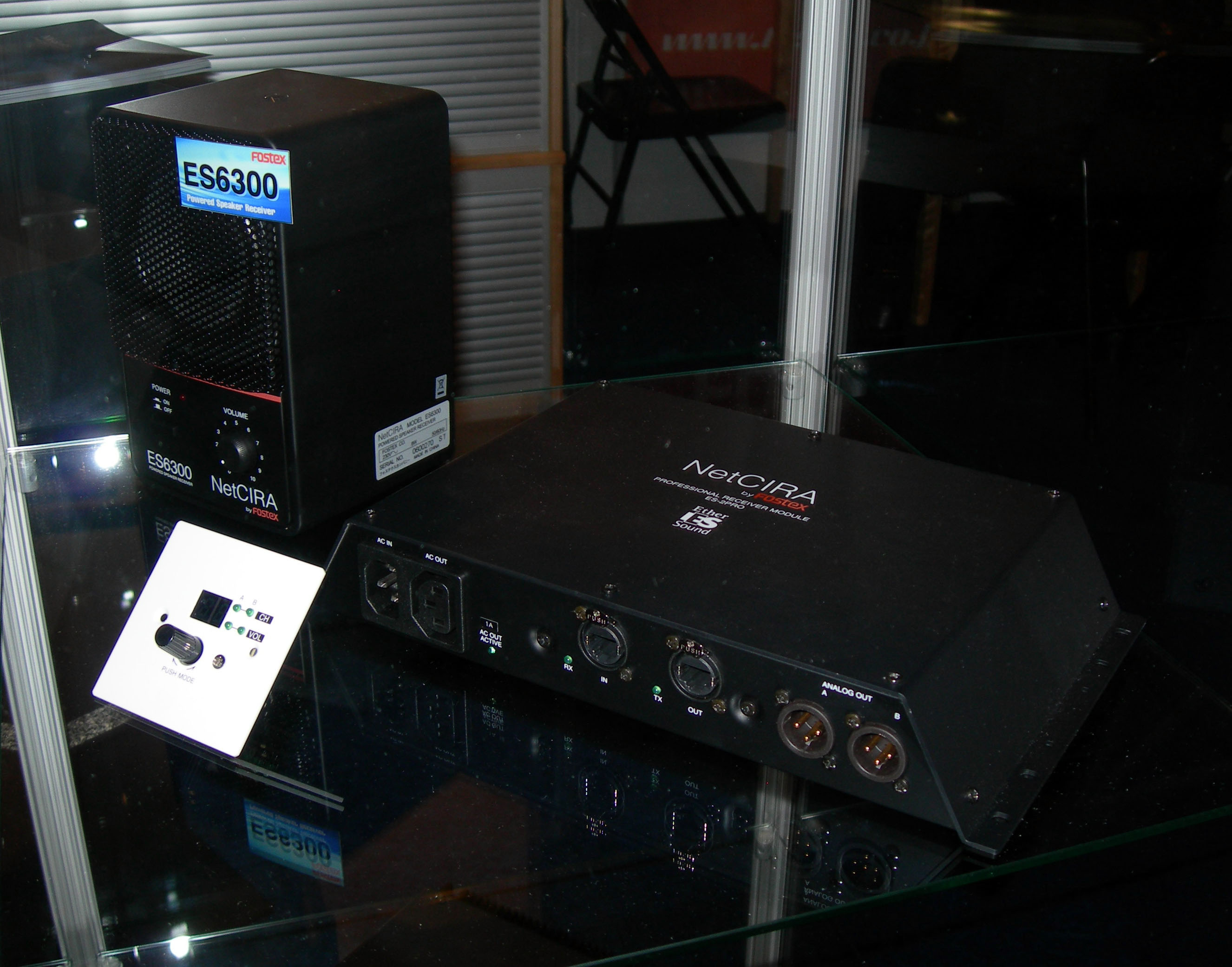
Left: Fostex NetCIRA ES6300 – active speaker receiver which receives audio data converted to EtherSound protocol; right: Fostex NetCIRA ES-2PRO – EtherSound to analog audio converter

EtherSound is an audio-over-Ethernet technology for audio engineering and broadcast engineering applications. EtherSound is developed and licensed by Digigram. EtherSound is intended by the developer to be compliant with IEEE 802.3 Ethernet standards. Just as the IEEE defines rates such as 100 Megabit and Gigabit Ethernet standards, EtherSound has been developed as both ES-100 (for use on dedicated 100 Megabit Ethernet networks or within a Gigabit network as a VLAN) and ES-Giga (for use on dedicated Gigabit Ethernet networks). The two versions of EtherSound are not compatible.

== Network technology ==
While EtherSound is compliant with the IEEE 802.3 physical layer standards, logically it uses a token passing scheme for transporting audio data, which prevents all of its features from being used on a standard Ethernet network. On a standard network, it is only able to distribute audio and control data one way. It is not designed to share Ethernet LANs with typical office operations data or Internet traffic such as email. It supports two-way communications only when wired in a daisy chain topology. For this reason, Ethersound is best used in applications suitable to a daisy chain network topology or in live sound applications that benefit from its low point-to-point latency.

== Low latency ==
Low latency is important for many users of audio over Ethernet technologies. (Note: One of the most critical applications involves picking up sound from a vocalist's or instrumentalist's microphone on a live performance stage, mixing that signal with those received from other microphones (and performers) and delivering the mix to the performer via in-ear monitors. Latency in this application is particularly annoying to vocalists. This is because a singer hears his or her own voice through bone conduction as well as through the outer ear. If the sound from the in-ear monitor lags the bone-conduction sound by more than a few milliseconds, phase shifts and comb filtering will become audible.) EtherSound can deliver up to 64 channels of 48 kHz, 24-bit PCM audio data with a network latency of 125 microseconds. If A/D and D/A conversions are included, this latency is about 1.5 milliseconds, with the major part of this latency being caused by the converters. Each device in a daisy-chain network adds 1.4 microseconds of latency. EtherSound's network latency is stable and deterministic; The delay between any two devices on an EtherSound network can be calculated.

== EtherSound Licensees ==
The following companies have licensed the EtherSound technology.

- Allen & Heath
- Amadeus
- Apex Audio
- Archean Technologies
- Audio Performance
- AuviTran
- AuxTran
- Barix
- Bittner Audio
- Bouyer
- CAMCO Audio
- Crest
- DiGiCo
- Focusrite
- Fostex
- Innovason
- Klein + Hummel
- LabX technologies
- Martin Audio
- Mediachip
- Nexo
- Peavey Electronics
- Pinanson
- QSC
- Richmond Sound Design
- Studer
- VTG Audio
- Whirlwind
- Yamaha Corporation
