= List of PTP implementations =

Systems supporting Precision Time Protocol

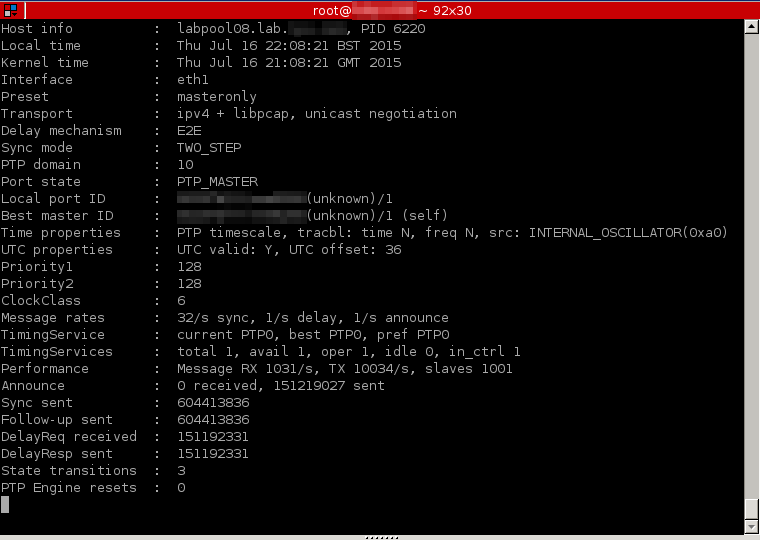
Screenshot of PTPd 2.3.1, an implementation of PTP for Unix-like systems

Precision Time Protocol (PTP) is a protocol for delivery of precise time over a computer network. A complete PTP system includes PTP functionality in network equipment and hosts. PTP may be implemented in hardware, software or a combination of both. PTP implementations may have the ability to serve as a source of time for the network, a grandmaster, or operate as a slave and receive time and synchronize to the grandmaster. This page contains a list of PTP implementations.

== Routers and switches ==
- Artel | Quarra 1 Gbps PTP Ethernet Switch
- Artel | Quarra PTP 10 Gbps Ethernet Switch
- ACRA Control, Limited (now Curtiss-Wright) airborne switches
- ADVA (now part of Adtran) FSP150XG-118Pro (and others)
- Alcatel-Lucent (now Nokia Networks) 7210 Service Access Switch
- Alcatel-Lucent 7705 Service Aggregation Router
- Alcatel-Lucent 7750 Service Router
- Allen-Bradley Stratix 5400, 5410, 5700, 8000 Managed Switches
- Arista 7050X/X2/X3 Series Switches
- Arista 7060X/X2 Series Switches
- Arista 7150 Series Switches
- Arista 7280E/R/R2 Series Switches
- Arista 7500E/R/R2 Series Switches
- Aruba 2930M Series Switches (with WC.16.04 software release)
- Aruba CX 6300 M series
- Aruba CX 8360
- BitStream Hyperion 300/402/500 Series Switches
- Brocade 6910 Ethernet Access Switch
- Dell EMC PowerSwitch S4100-ON Series Switches
- Dell EMC PowerSwitch S5200-ON Series Switches
- Cisco 7600 Router
- Cisco ASR 903 Router
- Cisco ASR 9000 Router
- Cisco Catalyst 9300 Switch
- Cisco CGS 2520 Switch
- Cisco Industrial Ethernet 3000 Series Switches
- Cisco Industrial Ethernet 5000 Series Switches
- Cisco Nexus 3000 Series Switches
- Cisco Nexus 5000 Series Switches
- Cisco Nexus 7000 router
- Cisco Nexus 9000 router
- Connect Tech Inc. Xtreme/10G Managed Ethernet Switch/Router
- Crystal Instruments IEEE 1588 Spider-HUB Industrial Ethernet Switch
- Ericsson Router 6000 series
- Extreme Networks E4G-200 router
- Extreme Networks E4G-400 router
- Fibrolan Falcon-R Class xHaul Switche/Grandmaster
- Fibrolan Falcon-M Class Switches/Routers
- Fibrolan Falcon-MTS Grandmaster
- Fibrolan uFalcon-S Switch series
- Fibrolan uFalcon-ST Switch series
- GarrettCom 10KT Industrial Managed 1588v2 Switch
- GarrettCom 12KX Industrial Managed 1588v2 Ethernet Switch
- HBM Rugged Ethernet PTPv2 Switch with PoE: SomatXR EX23-R
- Hirschmann MACH1040 19" Industrial Ethernet Switches with IEEE 1588v2 support
- Hirschmann MICE Modular Industrial Ethernet Rail Switch Modules with IEEE 1588v2 support
- IBM RackSwitch G8264 and IBM RackSwitch G8316
- iS5 Communications Raptor Switch
- Juniper Networks MX Universal Edge Routers
- Juniper Networks QFX
- Kyland SICOM3028GPT series
- Kyland SICOM3000A series
- Kyland Ruby3A
- Mellanox SN2100 / SN2700 (Spectrum silicon) switches with MLNX-OS/ONYX (in GA since 3.6.5011) for PTP IEEE-1588 (SMPTE ST2059-2 profile) or with Cumulus Linux (from version 3.6) with the ptp4l Linux package.
- Mikrotik some switches from the CRS3xx and CRS5xx series
- NVIDIA Ethernet networking (Connect-X NIC's, Bluefield DPU's, Spectrum switches)
- Moxa PowerTrans series (PT-7728-PTP) and EDS-500 and EDS-600 series switches
- Oregano Systems syn1588 Gbit Switch
- Phoenix Contact Raptor Switches (FL Switch EP 6400, EP 6500, EP 7200, EP 7400, EP 7500)
- Planet Technology USA, some IGS switches (e.g. IGS-20040MT)
- Red Lion N-Tron Series NT24k All-Gigabit Managed Industrial Ethernet Switches
- Ruggedcom IEEE 1588 PTP Solutions including RSG2488, RSG2288, RX1000 and RS416
- Seven Solutions White Rabbit Precise PTP Switch
- Siemens SCALANCE X-300 and XR-300 Industrial Managed Ethernet Switch with 1588 support (all X308-2M, all XR-324-12M, all XR324-4M, all X302-7EEC and X307-2EEC)
- Teletronics Technology Corporation airborne switches
- TSN Systems - TSN Automotive Switch Q50.
- TSN Systems - TSN Automotive Switch 10G.
- EtherWAN IG5 Rack Series - Managed 24-port Gigabit and 4-port 1G/10G SFP+ Ethernet Switch
- EtherWAN EX73900X Series -Managed 12-port Gigabit and 4-port 10GSFP+ Ethernet Switch
- EtherWAN EX73900E Series - Managed 12-port Gigabit and 4-port 1G SFP Ethernet Switch

== Stand-alone solutions ==
- Antenna-integrated OTMC 100 PTP grandmaster clock from OMICRON Lab
- AVN-GMCS IEEE1588 PTP Grandmaster Clock with GPS Receiver from Sonifex
- Calnex Solutions provides a number of IEEE 1588v2 test products for field and factory use including Paragon-neo, Sentinel and Sentry
- EKOSync 1588A and 1588B IEEE 1588v2 PTP/NTP GPS clocks from EKOSinerji
- FSMLabs 1 GBps Pocket GrandMaster IEEE 1588v2 PTP/NTP GPS clocks from FSMLabs
- FSMLabs 10 GBps Enterprise GrandMaster IEEE 1588v2 PTP/NTP GPS clocks from FSMLabs
- IEEE 1588 PTP GPS Grandmaster Clock from Optimal Technologies
- IEEE 1588 PTP M68 production module from Qulsar (formerly Conemtech)
- IEEE 1588 PTP P6x Sub-System board from Qulsar (formerly Conemtech)
- IEEE 1588 PTP PCIe add in cards from Korusys
- IEEE 1588 PTP Solutions from FEI-Zyfer, Inc.
- IEEE 1588 PTP Solutions from Fibrolan
- IEEE 1588 PTP solutions from Microsemi
- IEEE 1588 PTP Solutions from Oscilloquartz SA
- IEEE 1588 PTP Network Clock Solutions from Albedo Telecom.
- IEEE 1588 PTP Test & Measurement itoring Solutions from Albedo Telecom
- IEEE 1588 PTP Time Converter TICRO 100 from OMICRON Lab
- IEEE 1588 solutions from Meinberg
- IEEE 1588v2 PTP GPS Master & Slave clocks from Masterclock
- IEEE 1588v2 PTP GPS Master & Slave clocks from Tekron
- IEEE 1588v2 PTP GPS Smartgrid clocks from Tekron
- IPITEK MSP-1588
- Open Time Server : 1GbE, Rubidium IEEE 1588 PTP, NTP, SyncE, PPS GNSS grandmaster clock from Timebeat.app
- Open Time Server : 10/25GbE, Rubidium IEEE 1588 PTP, NTP, SyncE, PPS GNSS grandmaster clock from Timebeat.app
- Open Timecard : PCIe card OCXO IEEE 1588 PTP, NTP, SyncE, PPS GNSS grandmaster clock from Timebeat.app
- Open Timecard : PCIe card Rubidium IEEE 1588 PTP, NTP, SyncE, PPS GNSS grandmaster clock from Timebeat.app
- syn1588 VIP single chip solution from Oregano Systems
- TSN Systems TSN Box 3.0 - Hardware Interface for Automotive and Industrial TSN Test & Measurement Applications.
- White Rabbit LEN from Seven Solutions
- White Rabbit ZEN Time Provider from Seven Solutions
- White Rabbit Cute-WR-DP from SyncTechnology
- White Rabbit Mini-WR from SyncTechnology
- IEEE 1588 PTP solutions from Mobatime (belongs to the Moser-Baer Group)
- IEEE 1588 PTP Solutions from PolyNet

== Software ==
- Domain Time II PTPv2 server and client for Windows and Linux from Greyware Automation Products, Inc.
- IEEE 1588 Hoptroff Time Suite Enterprise from Hoptroff Smart Timing | Built on the Zero Trust model and encrypted to maximum standards to ensure resilient cybersecurity, delivered via dedicated optic fibre connection | MiFID II, CAT FINRA NMS compliance |
- IEEE 1588 Protocol Software from HMS Industrial Networks (formerly IXXAT Automation GmbH).
- IEEE 1588 PTP 2002/2008 Master Stack Software from Real-Time Systems GmbH.
- IEEE 1588 PTP Stack, XR7 PTP, from TTTech Flexibilis Oy
- IEEE 1588 Stack from Civica Ltd.
- Microsoft Windows Server 2019
- Microsoft Windows 10 October 2018 Update (version 1809)
- Openptp from Flexibilis Oy is GPL licensed open source implementation of the IEEE 1588-2008 (Version 2) PTP specification.
- PTP Track Hound, free tool from Meinberg to record, visualize and analyze PTP network traffic
- PPSi, a multi-platform ptp implementation developed by CERN.
- PTPd and its derivatives
- Statime – a portable PTP implementation written in Rust
- syn1588 PTP Stack from Oregano Systems: A portable implementation of the complete IEEE1588-2008 standard with special features like Boundary Clock support, Unicast operation, IPv6 support and security enhancements.
- The Linux PTP Project – an implementation of the Precision Time Protocol (PTP) according to IEEE standard 1588 for Linux. The dual design goals are to provide a robust implementation of the standard and to use the most relevant and modern Application Programming Interfaces (API) offered by the Linux kernel.
- Timebeat – PTP synchronisation platform and monitoring solution.
- TimeKeeper PTP server and client from FSMLabs, Inc.
- TSEP Chronos: IEEE 1588 PTP 2008 Stack for Windows, Linux, and RTX64(IntervalZero) from Technical Software Engineering Plazotta.
- TsEX module of the NeEX platform - IEEE1588 compliant PTP stack by emagine
- UMAN PTP Stack - 802.1AS (gPTP), Automotive PTP 1.5.

== Silicon ==
- 8-Input, 14-Output, Dual DPLL Timing IC with IEEE 1588 Clock from Microsemi Corporation
- IEEE 1588 PTP Grandmaster Controller from Qulsar (formerly Conemtech)
- IEEE 1588 PTP Ethernet Switching Solutions from Vitesse Semiconductor
- IEEE 1588 PTP Synchronization Solutions from Zarlink Semiconductor
- IEEE 1588 PTP Synchronization Solutions from Semtech Corporation
- IEEE 1588 Clock and 10/100/1000 Mbit/s Packet Timestamper from Microsemi Corporation
- IEEE 1588 PTP Synchronization of Network Communications Equipment from Integrated Device Technology
- BroadPTP in network equipment using Broadcom silicon.

== Other ==
- IEEE 1588 PTP 1 Gb Ethernet Layer 2 Switch IP Core from Flexibilis Oy
- IEEE 1588 PTP Compliance from The White Rabbit Project in the Open Hardware Repository.
- IEEE 1588 PTP Embedded Timing Appliance from Black Brook Design
- IEEE 1588 PTP Hoptroff Traceable Time as a Service (TTaaS®) from Hoptroff Smart Timing
- IEEE 1588 PTP IP Core from IXXAT Automation GmbH
- IEEE 1588 PTP IP Core from OpenCores
- IEEE 1588 PTP IP Cores for Xilinx FPGAs from System-on-Chip engineering
- IEEE 1588 PTP IP Cores from Optimal Technologies
- IEEE 1588 PTP Solutions for industrial Ethernet networking and computing from Moxa
- IEEE 1588 PTP Solutions from ELPROMA and CERN
- IEEE 1588 PTP Solutions from EndRun Technologies
- IEEE 1588 PTP Solutions from InES ZHAW
- IEEE 1588 PTP Solutions from Meinberg Funkuhren
- IEEE 1588 PTP Solutions from Microsemi
- IEEE 1588 PTP Solutions from NetTimeLogic GmbH
- IEEE 1588 PTP / White Rabbit Solutions from OPNT B.V.
- IEEE 1588 PTP Solutions from Oregano Systems
- IEEE 1588 PTP Solutions from Oscilloquartz
- IEEE 1588 PTP Solutions from Qulsar (formerly Conemtech)
- IEEE 1588 PTP Solutions from Orolia (formerly Spectracom)
- IEEE 1588 PTP Solutions from Time & Frequency Solutions
- IEEE 1588 PTP Solutions from Trimble.Inc
- IEEE 1588 PTP Synchronization Solutions from Integrated Device Technology
- IEEE 1588-2008 Management Tool from IXXAT Automation GmbH
- IEEE 1588 PTP Solutions from Polynet
- IEEE 1588 PTP Synchronization Solutions from Signals and Systems (India) (SANDS)
