= Hatteras =

Hatteras may refer to:

- The Adventures of Captain Hatteras, the novel by Jules Verne
- Hatteras Networks, a North Carolina–based telecommunications equipment provider
- Hatteras people, the Roanoke-Hatteras Indian tribe

Places:

- Hatteras, North Carolina
- Hatteras Island, an island in North Carolina's Outer Banks
- Cape Hatteras, a key navigation point along the eastern seaboard of the United States
  - Cape Hatteras Lighthouse, a historic navigational aid

Vehicles:

- USS Hatteras (AVP-42), a Barnegat-class small seaplane tender that was canceled in 1943, prior to construction
- USS Hatteras (1861), a steamer which served during the American Civil War
- USS Hatteras (ID-2142), which served as a cargo ship during World War I, and was decommissioned in 1919
