= Symmetricom =

American timekeeping products manufacturer

- Company type: Public
- Traded as: NASDAQ: SYMM
- Industry: Timekeeping electronics
- Defunct: 2013
- Successor: Microsemi
- Headquarters: San Jose, California, USA
- Revenue: $208.1 Million (FY 2011)
- Operating income: $4.3 Million (FY 2011)
- Net income: $24.3 Million (FY 2011)
- Total assets: $235.8 Million (FY 2011)
- Total equity: $184.2 Million (FY 2011)
- Number of employees: 584 (June 2011)
- Website: symmetricom.com at the Wayback Machine (archived 2011-07-10)

Symmetricom, Inc. was an American company specialized in high precision timekeeping technology. Symmetricom products supported precise timing standards, including GPS-based timing, IEEE 1588 (PTP), Network Time Protocol (NTP), Synchronous Ethernet and DOCSIS timing.

== Products ==
Products included hydrogen masers, rubidium and cesium atomic standards, temperature and oven controlled crystal oscillators, miniature and chip scale atomic clocks, network time servers, network sync management systems, cable timekeeping solutions, telecom synchronization supply units (SSUs), and timing test sets.

Symmetricom was one of the only two world’s commercial supplier of cesium atomic clocks - the other one is Oscilloquartz, in Switzerland.

By weighted average, Symmetricom atomic clocks contributed over 90% of UTC (Coordinated Universal Time, the world time standard). The International Bureau of Weights and Measures (BIPM) calculates UTC by averaging the combined contributions of the national laboratories of its member countries.

== History ==
Symmetricom was headquartered in San Jose, California with research and development centers in Boulder, Colorado; Beverly, Massachusetts; Tuscaloosa, Alabama; and Beijing, China.

Symmetricom and Datum were to merge in 2002.

The company was acquired by Microsemi in 2013 for $230 million, which was in turn acquired by Microchip in 2018.
