= Jakhongir =

Jakhongir is a given name. Notable people with the name include:

- Jakhongir Artikkhodjayev, Uzbekistani politician
- Jakhongir Jalilov (born 1989), Tajikistani footballer
- Jakhongir Khudayberdiev, Uzbekistani taekwondo practitioner
- Jakhongir Vakhidov (born 1995), Uzbekistani chess player
- Jakhongir Zokirov (born 2003), Uzbekistani boxer
