= Mark C. Smith =

- Born: September 10, 1940; Birmingham, Alabama
- Died: March 27, 2007 (aged 66); Huntsville, Alabama
- Occupation(s): Former Chief executive officer, founder ADTN
- Spouse: Linda Jones Smith

Mark C. Smith (September 10, 1940 – March 27, 2007) was the founder and chief executive officer of ADTRAN.

== Early life and education ==
While still in high school, Smith won a science fair at age 16 and met renowned rocket scientist Wernher von Braun in Huntsville, Alabama. He received an electrical engineering degree from Georgia Tech in 1962.

== Career ==
Mark C. Smith moved to Huntsville, where he founded two successful companies, the earlier being modem manufacturer Universal Data Systems in 1969. Smith went on to co-found ADTRAN in 1986 with Lonnie S. McMillian. As of 2007 the company had a market-cap of $1.7 billion. Smith retired from ADTRAN in September 2005.

== Death and legacy ==
Mark Smith and his wife Linda were known for their philanthropic support of causes in the Huntsville area including the University of Alabama in Huntsville and the Huntsville Symphony Orchestra.

He died in 2007 due to complications from pneumonia.
