= ADVA Optical Networking =

German telecommunications company

ADVA Optical Networking SE
- Type: Societas Europaea
- Traded as: FWB: ADV
- ISIN: DE0005103006
- Industry: Telecommunications equipment
- Founded: 1994
- Headquarters: Martinsried, Upper Bavaria, Germany
- Key people: Brian Protiva (CEO); Nikos Theodosopoulos (chairman of the supervisory board); Christoph Glingener (CTO); Ulrich Dopfer (CFO); Scott St. John (CMSO)
- Products: Wavelength division multiplexers, Carrier Ethernet access products, Network management software
- Revenue: €603.3 million (end 2021)
- Operating income: €45.3 million (end 2021)
- Net income: €59.2 million (end 2021)
- Total assets: €601.5 million (end 2021)
- Total equity: €339.9 million (end 2021)
- Number of employees: 1,973 (end 2021)
- Parent: Adtran
- Website: adva.com at the Wayback Machine (archived 2020-03-11)

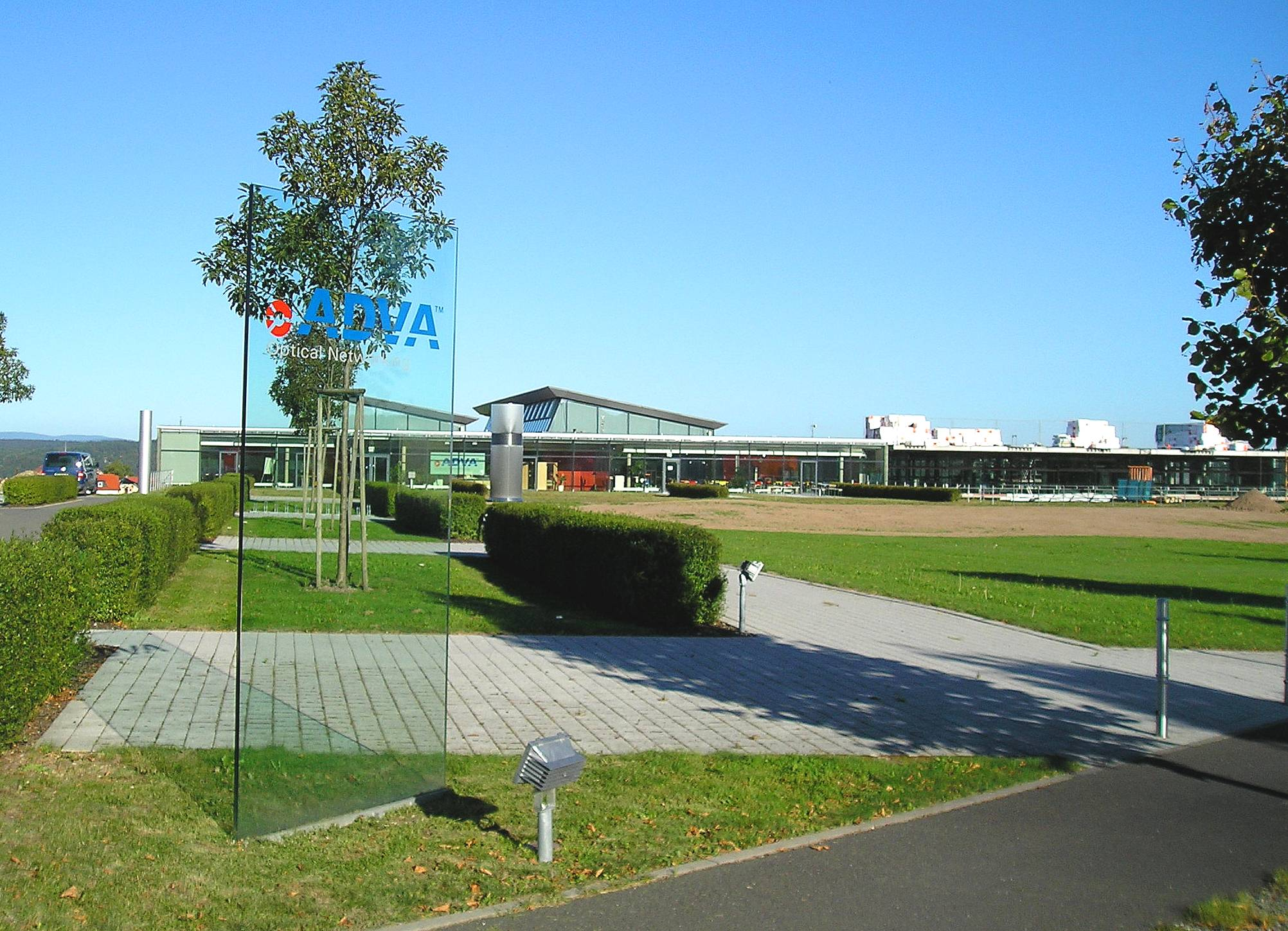
The main entrance of ADVA Optical Networking AG in Meiningen, 2006

ADVA Optical Networking SE was a German telecommunications company specialized in network equipment for data, storage, voice and video services, was founded in 1994 by Brian Protiva. On August 30, 2021, it was announced that ADVA and ADTRAN Holdings would be merging, continuing business under the name Adtran.

== History ==
Logo as of 1998

ADVA was founded in 1994 by Brian Protiva. It established its headquarters in Martinsried in Munich (district) and its first production facility in Meiningen. Funded by Egora Holding, it was initially focused on the development of wavelength division multiplexing technology.

In 2016, ADVA was listed as the industry leader (#1 position) in Ovum's data center interconnect (DCI) global market share report, with the largest market share in both the metro ICP/CNP and enterprise categories.

ADVA demonstrated the world's first 100G quantum safe transport over 2800 km on 13 June 2018.

ADVA announced in August 2021 that they are planning a merger with ADTRAN in an all-stock transaction with ADTRAN shareholders to own approximately 54% and ADVA shareholders to own approximately 46% of the combined company.

=== Acquisitions ===
- In 2014, ADVA Optical Networking acquired Oscilloquartz
- In 2016, ADVA acquired Overture.
- In 2017, ADVA Optical Networking acquired its US rival, MRV Communications in an effort to increase its cloud access portfolio and strengthen its Network Edge portfolio. Following the acquisition, one MRV executive, Scott St. John, was appointed to ADVA's board.
