= Overture Networks =

Telecommunications company

- Logo as of 2015
- Company type: Privately held company
- Founded: July 2000
- Founder: Prayson Pate, Jeff Reedy
- Headquarters: Research Triangle Park, North Carolina, USA
- Area served: Worldwide
- Key people: Mike Aquino, President and CEO; Prayson Pate, Chief Technologist; Arthur Bergens, CFO
- Products: Networking and telecommunications equipment
- Number of employees: 75
- Website: overturenetworks.com at the Wayback Machine (archived 2005-11-01)

Overture Networks was a company that designed, manufactured, and marketed networking and telecommunications equipment. It was "a leading developer of converged packet access platforms for Carrier Ethernet services." Overture was headquartered in the Research Triangle Park in North Carolina and also maintained offices in Westford, MA and Bangalore, India.

Overture was a member of the Metro Ethernet Forum (MEF). It also held a TL 9000 certification which it received from the QuEST Forum in May 2007.

In January 2016, Overture was acquired by telecommunications vendor ADVA Optical Networking.

== History ==
Logo as of 2004

In 2000, Overture was launched by co-founders Jeff Reedy and Prayson Pate to develop solutions designed to help service providers and network operators transition to an all-packet network. In December 2008, Overture Networks acquired Ceterus Networks, a Richardson, Texas-based manufacturer of Carrier Ethernet equipment and technologies for mobile backhaul. In March 2011, Overture merged with Hatteras Networks, the number one-ranked Ethernet over Copper market leader and manufacturer of Ethernet service delivery solutions for the Carrier Ethernet, Metro Ethernet, and DSLAM and mobile wireless backhaul markets. Post-merger, the unified company operated under the Overture Networks name until February 2012, when a rebranding initiative was announced. Marking the final integration of the two companies, Overture introduced a new logo, color palette, company blog, and tagline, "Overture - An Entrance to a Smarter Network", and informally dropped "Networks" from its name.

Beginning in 2008, and continuing through 2009, 2010, and 2011, Overture was named as the number one provider of Ethernet over TDM (EoTDM) access circuits and Ethernet over bonded copper pair (EoC) platforms by analyst firm Heavy Reading.

In September 2012, Overture appointed former Ciena Corporation Senior VP of Global Field Operations, General Manager of Global Government Solutions, and VP of Americas, Mike Aquino, as its new President and Chief Executive Officer (CEO).

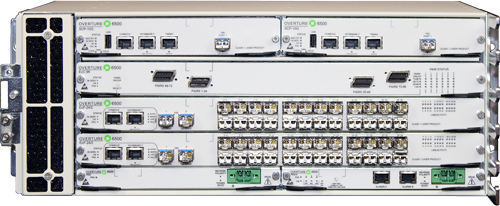
The Overture 6500

Overture announced the company's entry into the software-defined networking (SDN) space in March 2012 with the launch of a new product, Ensemble OSA. Ensemble OSA is an open architecture based on open API standards like OpenFlow and has three layers, which may include Overture-developed components, as well as those developed by service providers or third-party vendors. Overture followed this with the release of the Overture 6500, the first Ensemble OSA-ready platform and the inaugural product in its Open Service Delivery Family product line.

In January 2016, Overture was acquired by ADVA Optical Networking in a $35 million purchase which was reported to involve "an additional $5 million conditional 'earn-out' payment".

== Products ==
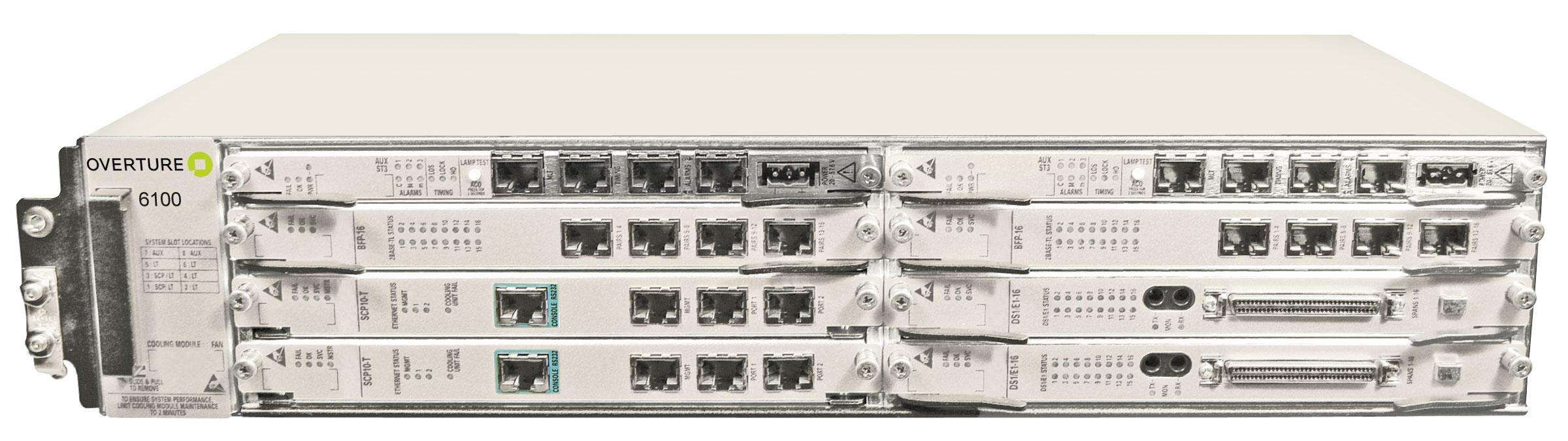
The Overture 6100

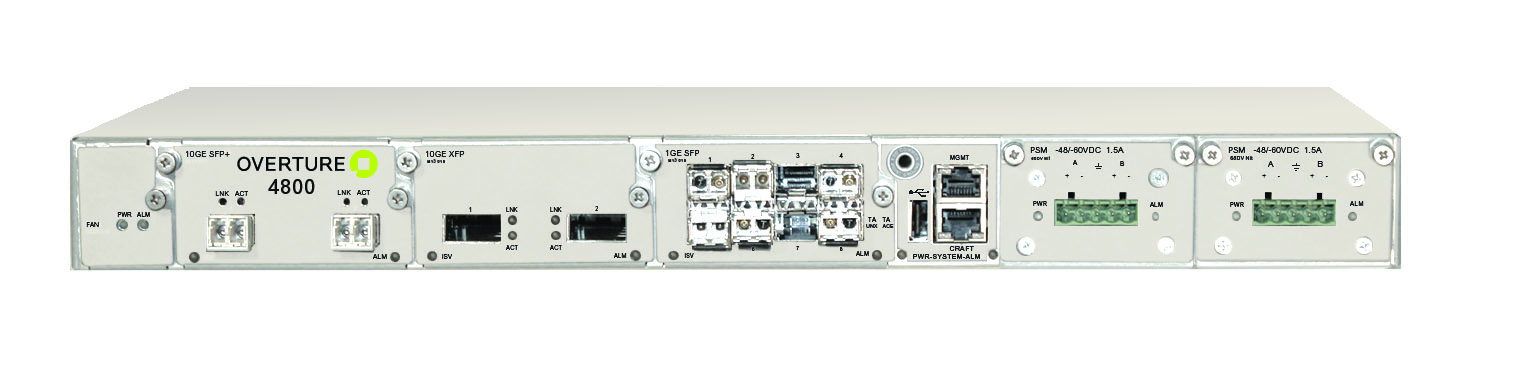
The Overture 4800

Overture's products were generally used in the following solution categories: business services, mobile backhaul, Ethernet transport and infrastructure for speeds from 1 Mbit/s to 10 Gbit/s, and SDN. The company's products addressed these core applications using a range of access technologies including optical Ethernet, Ethernet over bonded copper, Ethernet over TDM/SONET/SDH/PDH, and multi-service Carrier Ethernet that supported TDM pseudo-wires and IP service aggregation using VLANs. Targeted to users such as competitive local exchange carriers, incumbent local exchange carriers, cable companies, and wholesale ISPs, its technologies were used in applications and settings like cloud computing, data center services, and mobile data services. Overture Network's products achieved MEF 9, 14, and 18 certifications.
