= Power over Ethernet =

System for delivering power along with data over an Ethernet cable

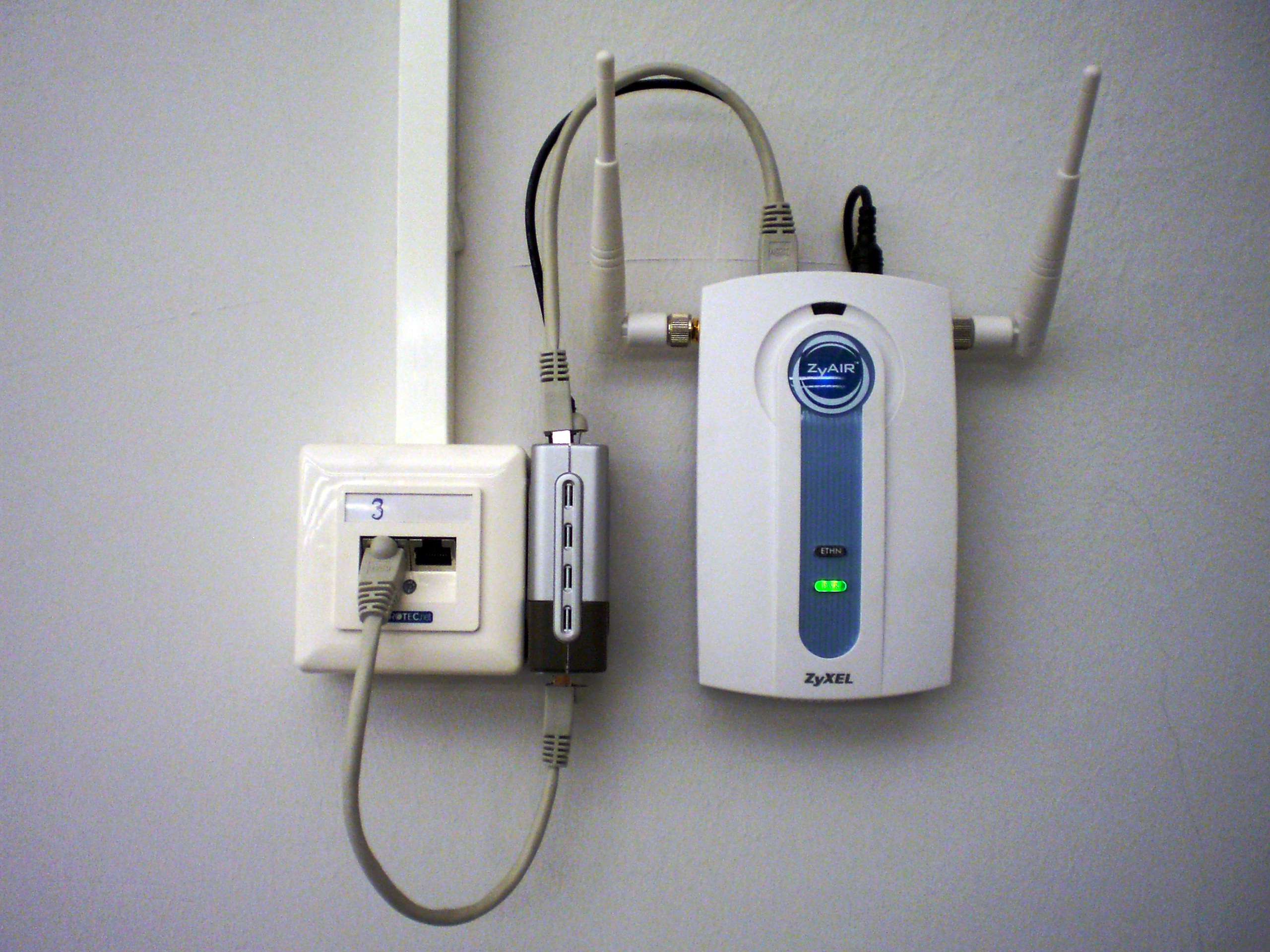
In this configuration, an Ethernet connection includes Power over Ethernet (PoE) (gray cable looping below), and a PoE splitter provides a separate data cable (gray, looping above) and power cable (black, also looping above) for a wireless access point. The splitter is the silver and black box in the middle between the wiring junction box (left) and the access point (right). The PoE connection eliminates the need for a nearby power outlet. In another common configuration, the access point or other connected device includes internal PoE splitting and the external splitter is not necessary.

Power over Ethernet (PoE) describes any of several standards or ad hoc systems that pass electric power along with data on twisted-pair Ethernet cabling. This allows a single cable to provide both a data connection and enough electricity to power networked devices such as wireless access points (WAPs), IP cameras and VoIP phones.

== Techniques ==
ANSI/TIA-568 T568A termination
Pin	Pair	Color
1	3	white/green
2	3	green
3	2	white/orange
4	1	blue
5	1	white/blue
6	2	orange
7	4	white/brown
8	4	brown

There are several common techniques for transmitting power over Ethernet cabling, defined within the broader Institute of Electrical and Electronics Engineers (IEEE) 802.3 standard since 2003.

The three techniques are:

- Alternative A or Mode A uses the same two of the four signal pairs that 10BASE-T and 100BASE-TX use for data in typical Cat 5 cabling, i.e. pairs 2 and 3.
- Alternative B or Mode B separates the data and the power conductors for 10BASE-T/100BASE-TX, making troubleshooting easier, i.e. pairs 1 and 4.
- 4PPoE or 4-pair mode uses all four twisted pairs in parallel, increasing the achievable power.

Alternative A transmits power on the same wires as data for common 10 and 100 Mbit/s Ethernet variants. This is similar to the phantom power technique commonly used for powering condenser microphones. Power is transmitted on the data conductors by applying a common voltage to each pair. Because twisted-pair Ethernet uses differential signaling, this does not interfere with data transmission. The common-mode voltage is easily extracted using the center tap of the standard Ethernet pulse transformer. For gigabit Ethernet and faster, both alternatives A and B transmit power on wire pairs also used for data since all four pairs are used for data transmission at these speeds.

4PPoE provides power using all four pairs of the connectors used for twisted-pair Ethernet. This enables higher power for applications like pan–tilt–zoom cameras (PTZ), high-performance wireless access points (WAPs), or even charging laptop batteries.

In addition to standardizing existing practice for common-mode data pair (Alternative A), spare-pair (Alternative B), and four-pair (4PPoE) transmission, the IEEE PoE standards provide for signaling between the power sourcing equipment (PSE) and powered device (PD). This signaling allows the presence of a conformant device to be detected by the power source and allows the device and source to negotiate the amount of power required or available while avoiding damage to non-compatible devices.

== Standards development ==
=== Two- and four-pair Ethernet ===
The original PoE standard, IEEE 802.3af-2003, now known as Type 1, provides up to 15.4 W of DC power (minimum 44 V DC and 350 mA) on each port. Only 12.95 W is guaranteed to be available at the powered device, as some power dissipates in the cable.

The first update to PoE, IEEE 802.3at-2009, introduced Type 2, also known as PoE+ or PoE plus. It provides up to 25.5 W and prohibits the use of four pairs simultaneously for power.

Both of these standards, 802.3af and 802.3at, were later incorporated into the IEEE 802.3-2012 publication.

Later Type 3 and Type 4 were introduced in IEEE 802.3bt-2018, respectively allowing up to 51 W and up to 71.3 W delivered power, optionally by using all four pairs for power. Each pair needs to handle a current of up to 600 mA (Type 3) or 960 mA (Type 4). Additionally, power capabilities are defined for 2.5GBASE-T, 5GBASE-T and 10GBASE-T. This development opens the door to new applications and expands the use of applications such as high-performance wireless access points and surveillance cameras.

IEEE 802.3bt was incorporated into 802.3 in the 2022 revision.

=== Single-pair Ethernet ===
The IEEE 802.3bu-2016 amendment introduced single-pair Power over Data Lines (PoDL) for the single-pair Ethernet standards 100BASE-T1 and 1000BASE-T1 intended for automotive and industrial applications. On the two-pair and four-pair standards, the power voltage is applied between one conductor of each of two pairs, so that within each pair there is no differential voltage other than that representing the transmitted data. With single-pair Ethernet, power is transmitted in parallel to the data. PoDL initially defined ten power classes, ranging from 0.5 to 50 W (at PD).

Subsequently, PoDL was added to the single-pair variants 10BASE-T1, 2.5GBASE-T1, 5GBASE-T1, and 10GBASE-T1, and as of 2021 it includes a total of 15 power classes with additional intermediate voltage and power levels.

== Uses ==
Products using PoE
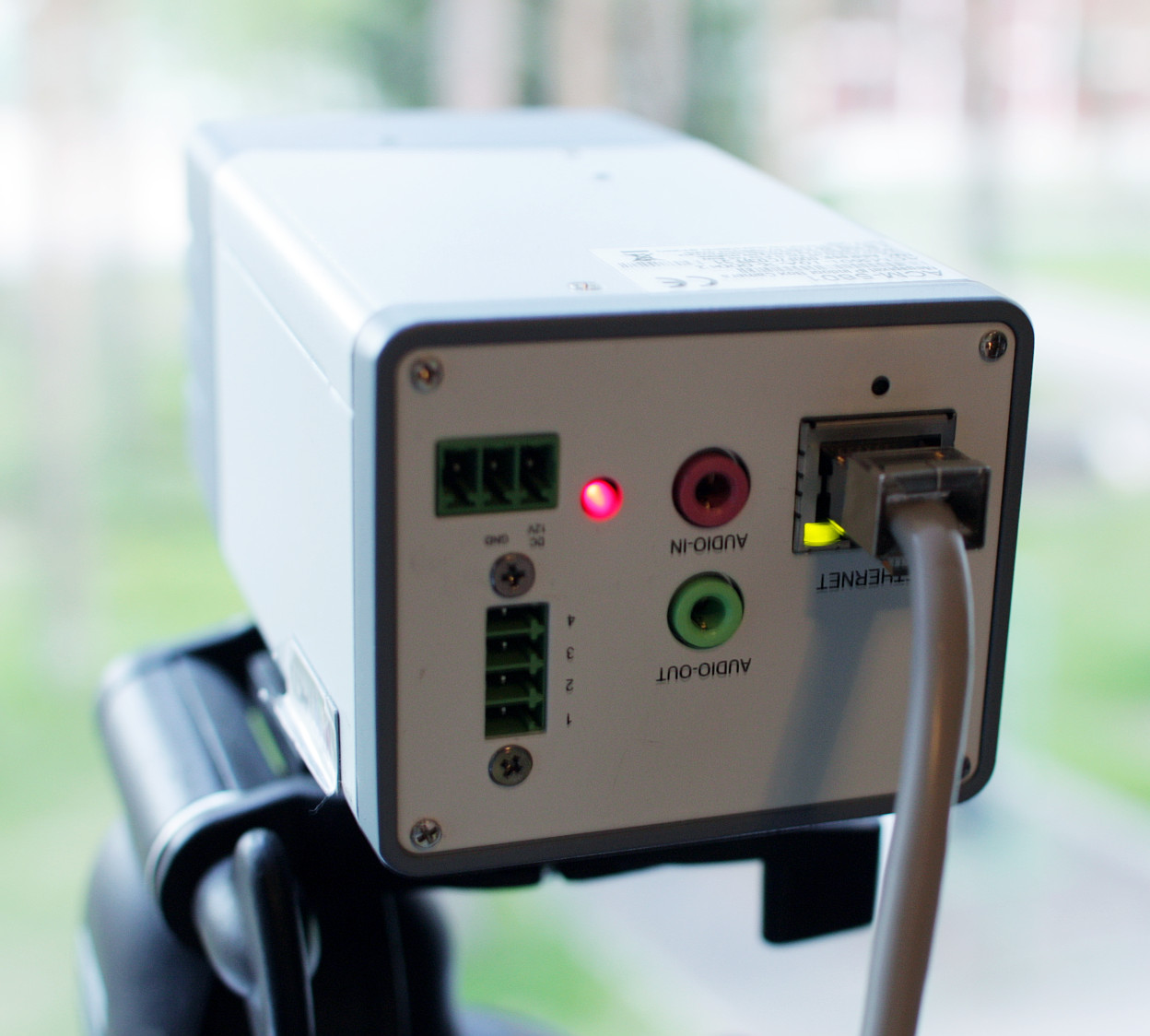
An IP camera powered and networked by Power over Ethernet

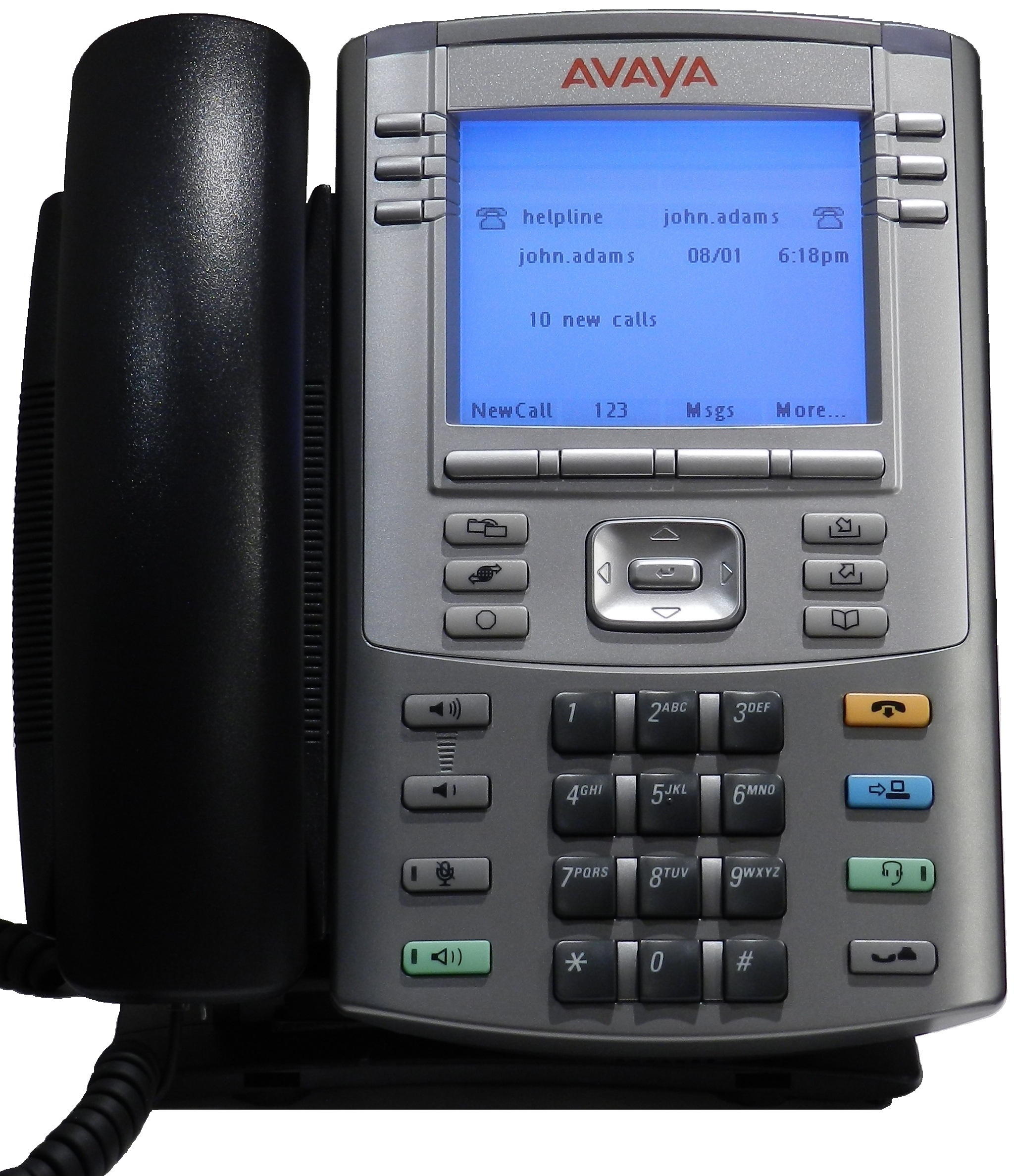
Avaya IP Phone 1140E with PoE support

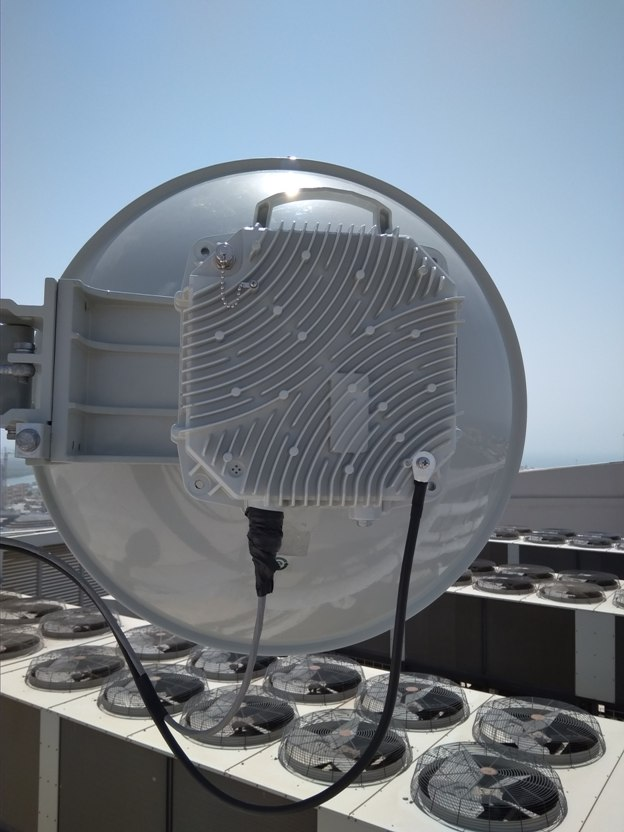
A CableFree FOR3 microwave link installed in the UAE: a full outdoor radio featuring proprietary high power over Ethernet

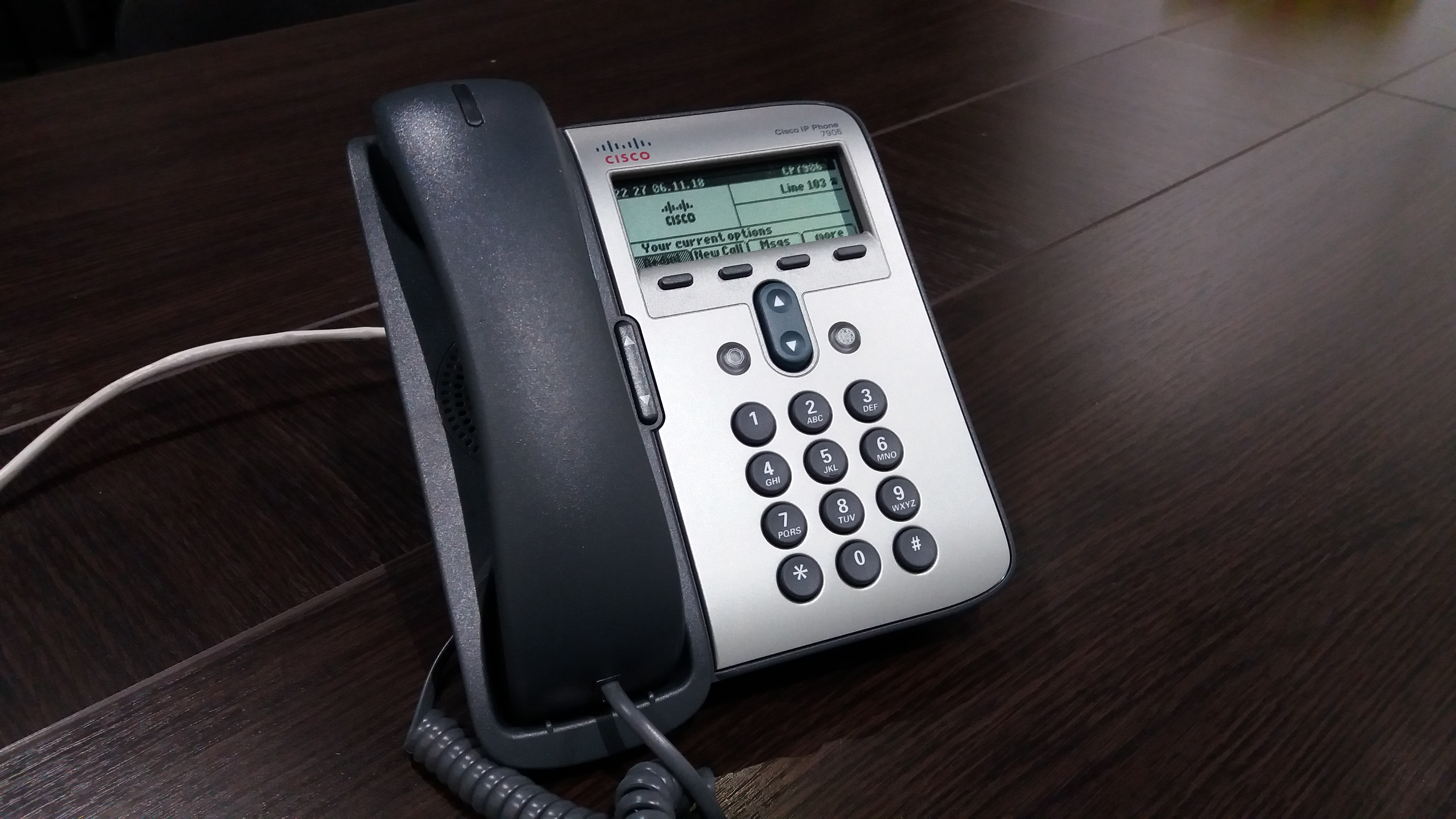
Cisco 7906 VoIP phone with PoE

Examples of devices powered by PoE include:

- VoIP phones
- IP cameras, including PTZs
- WAPs
- IPTV decoders
- Network routers
- A small network switch, providing a small number of Ethernet ports from one uplink cable. Such a switch may, in turn, pass PoE to downstream devices (termed PoE pass-through).
- Intercom and public address systems
- Wall clocks, with time set using Network Time Protocol (NTP)
- Roof-mounted radios with integrated antennas, 4G/LTE-, 802.11- or 802.16-based systems used by wireless ISPs
- Outdoor point-to-point microwave and millimeter-wave radios and some free-space optics units, usually using non-standard, proprietary PoE
- Industrial control system components, including sensors, controllers, meters, etc.
- Access control components, including help points, intercoms, keyless entry, etc.
- Lighting controllers and light-emitting diode (LED) lighting fixtures
- Stage and theatrical devices, such as networked audio breakout and routing boxes
- Remote point-of-sale (POS) kiosks
- Ethernet repeaters, or extenders, which may also pass PoE through to downstream devices
- PoE splitters that output the power in a different form (e.g. USB Power Delivery), to power a remote device or charge a mobile phone

== Terminology ==
=== Power sourcing equipment ===
802.3 refers to Power Sourcing Equipment (PSE), which provides power on the Ethernet cable. This device may be a network switch, in the standard Endpoint PSE (commonly called an endspan device) or a PoE injector, Midspan PSE in the standard, an intermediary device between a switch that does not provide PoE (or one that cannot provide sufficient power) and a PoE-powered device.

=== Powered device ===
802.3 refers to any PoE-powered piece of equipment as a Powered Device (PD). Examples include wireless access points, VoIP phones, and IP cameras.

Many powered devices have an auxiliary power connector for an optional external power supply. Depending on the design, some, none, or all of the device's power can be supplied from the auxiliary port, with the auxiliary port also sometimes providing backup power in case PoE-supplied power fails.

== Power management features and integration ==
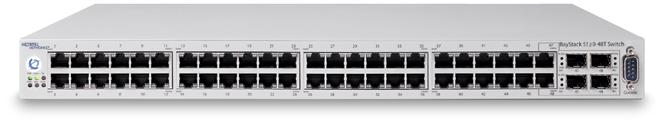
Avaya ERS 5500 switch with 48 Power over Ethernet ports

Advocates of PoE expect PoE to become a global long-term DC power cabling standard and replace a multiplicity of individual AC adapters, which cannot be easily centrally managed. Critics of this approach argue that PoE is inherently less efficient than AC power due to the lower voltage, and this is made worse by the thin conductors of Ethernet. Advocates of PoE, like the Ethernet Alliance, point out that quoted losses are for worst-case scenarios in terms of cable quality, length and power consumption by powered devices. In any case, where the central PoE supply replaces several dedicated AC circuits, transformers and inverters, the power loss in cabling can be justifiable.

=== Integrating EEE and PoE ===
The integration of PoE with the IEEE 802.3az Energy-Efficient Ethernet (EEE) standard potentially produces additional energy savings. Pre-standard integrations of EEE and PoE (such as Marvell's EEPoE outlined in a May 2011 white paper) claim to achieve a savings upwards of 3 W per link. This saving is especially significant as higher-power devices come online.

== Standard implementation ==
Standards-based Power over Ethernet is implemented following the specifications in IEEE 802.3af-2003 (which was later incorporated as Clause 33 into IEEE 802.3-2005) or the 2009 update, IEEE 802.3at. The standards require Category 5 cable or better for high power levels but allow using Category 3 cable if less power is required.

In multi-pair cases, PoE supplies power as a common-mode signal over two or more of the differential pairs in Ethernet cables. This power comes from a PoE-providing device like an Ethernet switch or a PoE injector.

This phantom power technique works with 10BASE-T, 100BASE-TX, 1000BASE-T, 2.5GBASE-T, 5GBASE-T, and 10GBASE-T because all twisted pair standards use differential signaling with transformer coupling. The DC supply and load connections can be made to the transformer center-taps at each end. Since each pair operates in common mode as one side of the DC supply, two pairs are needed to complete the circuit.

The powered device must operate with either pair: the spare pairs on pins 4 and 5, and 7 and 8, or the data pairs on pins 1 and 2, and 3 and 6. Polarity is defined by the standards on spare pairs (4+5+, 7-8-). The polarity of the DC supply on data pairs may be inverted by crossover cables and hence the polarity is ambiguously implemented for data pairs, with the use of a diode bridge. (It is customary to use 1+2+, 3-6- on T568A.)

Comparison of PoE parameters
Official name in IEEE 802.3	Type 1	Type 2	Type 3	Type 4
Common name(s)	PoE	PoE+	PoE++ / 4PPoE	
Defining IEEE document	802.3af	802.3at	802.3bt	
Power available at PD (Note: Most switched-mode power supplies within the powered device will lose another 10 to 25% of the available power to heat.)	12.95 W	25.50 W	51 W	71.3 W
Maximum power delivered by PSE	15.40 W	30.0 W	60 W	90 W
Voltage range (at PSE)	44.0–57.0 V	50.0–57.0 V		52.0–57.0 V
Voltage range (at PD)	37.0–57.0 V	42.5–57.0 V		41.1–57.0 V
Maximum current I_{max}	350 mA	600 mA per pair		960 mA per pair
Maximum cable resistance per pairset	20 Ω (Category 3)	12.5 Ω (Category 5)		
Power management	Three power classes (1–3) negotiated by signature	Four power classes (1–4) negotiated by signature or 0.1 W steps negotiated by LLDP	Six power classes (1–6) negotiated by signature or 0.1 W steps negotiated by LLDP	Eight power classes (1–8) negotiated by signature or 0.1 W steps negotiated by LLDP
Derating of cable maximum ambient operating temperature	None	5 °C (9.0 °F) with only two pairs active, at I_{max}	10 °C (18 °F) with all of the bundled cables pairs active, at I_{max}	10 °C (18 °F) with temperature planning required
Supported cabling	Category 3 and Category 5	Category 5 (Note: More stringent cable specification allows assumption of more current-carrying capacity and lower resistance (20.0 Ω for Category 3 versus 12.5 Ω for Category 5).)		
Supported modes	Mode A (from Endpoint PSE), Mode B (from Midspan PSE)	Mode A, Mode B	Mode A, Mode B, 4-pair mode	4-pair mode mandatory

=== Powering devices ===
Three modes, Mode A, Mode B, and 4-pair mode, are available. (In the standard, these are discussed as two Modes, with the term 4-pair mode for both simultaneously.) Mode A delivers power on T568A and T568B pairs 2 and 3 – the data pairs of 100BASE-TX or 10BASE-T. Mode B delivers power on pairs 1 and 4 – the pairs not used by 100BASE-TX or 10BASE-T. 4-pair mode delivers power using all four pairs. PoE can also be used with 1000BASE-T, 2.5GBASE-T, 5GBASE-T and 10GBASE-T Ethernet, in which case there are no spare pairs and all power is delivered using the phantom technique.

Mode A has two alternative configurations (MDI and MDI-X), using the same pairs but with different polarities. In Mode A, pins 1 and 2 (pair 3 in T568A wiring, pair 2 in T568B) form one side of the 48 V DC, and pins 3 and 6 (pair 2 in T568A, pair 3 in T568B) form the other side. These are the same two pairs used for data transmission in 10BASE-T and 100BASE-TX, allowing the provision of both power and data over only two pairs in such networks. The free polarity allows PoE to accommodate crossover cables, patch cables and auto MDI-X.

In Mode B, pins 4–5 (pair 1 in both T568A and T568B) form one side of the DC supply and pins 7–8 (pair 4 in both T568A and T568B) provide the return; these are the pairs 10BASE-T and 100BASE-TX do not use. Mode B, therefore, requires that all four pairs of the connectors be wired.

The Power Sourcing Equipment (PSE), not the Powered Device (PD), decides whether Mode A or Mode B shall be used. PDs that implement only Mode A or Mode B are disallowed by the standard. The PSE can implement Mode A, Mode B, or both (4-pair mode). A PD indicates that it is standards-compliant by placing a 25 kΩ resistor between the powered pairs. If the PSE detects a resistance that is too high or too low (including a short circuit), no power is applied. This protects devices that do not support PoE. An optional power class feature allows the PD to indicate its power requirements by changing the sense resistance at higher voltages.

To retain power, the PD must use at least 5–10 mA for at least 60 ms at a time. If the PD goes more than 400 ms without meeting this requirement, the PSE will consider the device disconnected and, for safety reasons, remove power.

There are two types of PSE: Endpoint and Midspan. Endpoint devices (commonly PoE switches) are Ethernet networking equipment that includes the power-over-Ethernet transmission circuitry. Midspan devices are power injectors that stand between a non-PoE Ethernet switch (or one that cannot provide sufficient power) and the powered device, injecting power without affecting the data. Endpoint devices are normally used in new installations or where the switch has to be replaced for other reasons (such as moving from 10/100 Mbit/s to 1 Gbit/s), which makes it convenient to add the PoE capability. Midspan PSE can be used e.g., to power a single piece of equipment added to a network that does not provide PoE.

Stages of powering up a PoE link
Stage	Action	Volts specified (V)	
Stage	Action	802.3af	802.3at
Detection	PSE detects if the PD has the correct signature resistance of 19–26.5 kΩ.	2.7–10.1	
Classification	PSE detects resistor indicating power range (see below).	14.5–20.5	
Mark 1	PD signals it is 802.3at-capable. PD presents a 0.25–4 mA load.	—	7–10
Class 2	PSE outputs Classification voltage again to indicate 802.3at capability.	—	14.5–20.5
Mark 2	PD signals it is 802.3at-capable. PD presents a 0.25–4 mA load.	—	7–10
Startup	PSE supplies startup voltage.	> 42	> 42
Normal operation	PSE supplies power to device.	37–57	42.5–57

IEEE 802.3at-capable devices are also referred to as Type 2. 802.3at PSE may also use LLDP communication to signal 802.3at capability.

Power levels available
Class	Usage	Classification current (mA)	Power range at PD (W)	Max power from PSE (W)	Class description
0	Default	0–5	0.44–12.94	15.4	Classification unimplemented
1	Optional	8–13	0.44–3.84	4.00	Very Low power
2	Optional	16–21	3.84–6.49	7.00	Low power
3	Optional	25–31	6.49–12.95	15.4	Mid power
4	Valid for Type 2 (802.3at) devices, not allowed for 802.3af devices	35–45	12.95–25.50	30	High power
5	Valid for Type 3 (802.3bt) devices	36–44 & 1–4	40 (4-pair)	45	
6	Valid for Type 3 (802.3bt) devices	36–44 & 9–12	51 (4-pair)	60	
7	Valid for Type 4 (802.3bt) devices	36–44 & 17–20	62 (4-pair)	75	
8	Valid for Type 4 (802.3bt) devices	36–44 & 26–30	71.3 (4-pair)	90	

Class 4 can only be used by IEEE 802.3at (Type 2) devices, requiring valid Class 2 and Mark 2 currents for the power-up stages. An 802.3af device presenting a Class 4 current is non-compliant and, instead, will be treated as a Class 0 device.

=== Configuration via Ethernet LLDP ===
Link Layer Discovery Protocol (LLDP) is a layer-2 Ethernet protocol for managing devices. LLDP allows an exchange of information between PSE and a PD. This information is formatted in type–length–value (TLV) format. PoE standards define TLV structures used by PSEs and PDs to signal and negotiate available power.

LLDP Power via MDI TLV IEEE 802.3-2015
TLV Header		TLV information string							
Type (7 bits)	Length (9 bits)	IEEE 802.3 OUI (3 octets)	IEEE 802.3 subtype (1 octet)	MDI power support (1 octet)	PSE power pair (1 octet)	Power class (1 octet)	Type/source priority (1 octet)	PD-requested power value (2 octets)	PSE-allocated power value (2 octets)
127	12	00-12-0F	2	Bit 0: port class (1: PSE; 0: PD); Bit 1: PSE MDI power support Bit 2: PSE MDI power state Bit 3: PSE pairs control ability Bits 4–7: reserved	1: signal pair 2: spare pair	1: Class 0; 2: Class 1; 3: Class 2; 4: Class 3; 5: Class 4	Bit 7: power type (1: Type 1; 0: Type 2); Bit 6: power type (1: PD; 0: PSE); Bits 5–4: power source Bits 3–2: reserved Bits 0–1 power priority (11: low; 10: high; 01: critical; 00: unknown)	0–25.5 W in 0.1 W steps	0–25.5 W in 0.1 W steps

Legacy LLDP Power via MDI TLV IEEE 802.1AB-2009
TLV Header		TLV information string				
Type (7 bits)	Length (9 bits)	IEEE 802.3 OUI (3 octets)	IEEE 802.3 subtype (1 octet)	MDI power support (1 octet)	PSE power pair (1 octet)	Power class (1 octet)
127	7	00-12-0F	2	Bit 0: port class (1: PSE; 0: PD); Bit 1: PSE MDI power support Bit 2: PSE MDI power state Bit 3: PSE pairs control ability Bits 7–4: reserved	1: signal pair 2: spare pair	1: class 0; 2: class 1; 3: class 2; 4: class 3; 5: class 4

Legacy LLDP-MED Advanced Power Management
TLV Header		MED Header		Extended power via MDI			
Type (7 bits)	Length (9 bits)	TIA OUI (3 octets)	Extended power via MDI subtype (1 octet)	Power type (2 bits)	Power source (2 bits)	Power priority (4 bits)	Power value (2 octets)
127	7	00-12-BB	4	PSE or PD	Normal or Backup conservation	Critical, High, Low	0–102.3 W in 0.1 W steps

The setup phases are as follows:

- The PSE (provider) tests the PD (consumer) physically using 802.3af phase class 3.
  - The PSE provides baseline power to the PD.
- The PD signals to the PSE that it as a PoE PD, indicating its maximum power and requested power.
- The PSE signals to PD that it is PoE PSE, indicating the power allotted to the PD, at which point the PD can begin consuming up to the allotted power.

The rules for this power negotiation are:

- The PD shall never request more power than the physical 802.3af class.
- The PD shall never draw more than the maximum power advertised by the PSE.
- The PSE may deny any PD drawing more power than the maximum it has allowed.
- The PSE shall not reduce power allocated to the PD that is in use.
- The PSE may request reduced power via conservation mode.

== Non-standard implementations ==
There are more than ten proprietary implementations. The more common ones are discussed below.

=== Cisco ===
Some Cisco WLAN access points and VoIP phones supported a proprietary form of PoE many years before there was an IEEE standard for delivering PoE. Cisco's original PoE implementation is not software upgradeable to the IEEE 802.3af standard. Cisco's original PoE equipment is capable of delivering up to 10 W per port. The amount of power to be delivered is negotiated between the endpoint and the Cisco switch based on a power value that was added to the Cisco proprietary Cisco Discovery Protocol (CDP). CDP is also responsible for dynamically communicating the Voice VLAN value from the Cisco switch to the Cisco VoIP Phone.

Under Cisco's pre-standard scheme, the PSE (switch) will send a fast link pulse (FLP) on the transmit pair. The PD (device) connects the transmit line to the receive line via a low-pass filter. The PSE gets the FLP in return. The PSE will provide a common mode current between pairs 1 and 2, resulting in 48 V DC and 6.3 W default of allocated power. The PD must then provide Ethernet link within 5 seconds to the auto-negotiation mode switch port. A later CDP message with a TLV tells the PSE its final power requirement. A discontinuation of link pulses shuts down power.

In 2014, Cisco created another non-standard PoE implementation called Universal Power over Ethernet (UPOE). UPOE can use all four pairs, after negotiation, to supply up to 60 W. It is backward compatible with PoE+ (802.3at). It uses a new LLDP TLV to negotiate.

In 2017, Cisco released Catalyst 9300, a switch with support for UPOE+, backwards compatible with both UPOE and PoE++ (802.3bt).

=== Analog Devices ===
A proprietary high-power development called LTPoE++, using a single Cat 5e Ethernet cable, is capable of supplying varying levels at 38.7, 52.7, 70, and 90 W. LTPoE++ is backward compatible with PoE+ (802.3at). LTPoE++ works by extending the current-sensing mechanism.

Powered devices compatible with both 802.3bt (PoE++) and non-standard LTPoE++ are available.

=== Microsemi ===
PowerDsine, acquired by Microsemi in 2007, which was then acquired by Microchip in 2018, has been selling power injectors since 1999. Using Microchip's multi-PoE PSE ICs, PoE injectors and switches can support the IEEE 802.3 PoE standards and also pre-standard configurations. Several companies such as Polycom, 3Com, Lucent and Nortel used PowerDsine's older Power over LAN PoE implementation.

=== Passive ===
In a passive PoE system, the injector does not communicate with the powered device to negotiate its voltage or wattage requirements but merely supplies power at all times. Most passive systems use the pinout of 802.3af mode B (see § Pinouts) – with DC positive on pins 4 and 5 and negative on 7 and 8. This was to simplify the construction of devices as it does not interfere with 100 Mbit/s signaling on pins 1, 2, and 3 and 6, but with Gigabit Ethernet, a transformer is required anyway. As a result, Gigabit vary between using the mode B-style (4+5+, 7-8-) and mode A-style (1+2+, 3-6-).

There is no voltage negotiation in a passive system, so the PSE and the PD must agree on a voltage beforehand. Common choices include:

- 24 V, commonly used with a variety of indoor and outdoor wireless radio equipment, most commonly from Motorola (now Cambium), Ubiquiti Networks, MikroTik and others. Earlier versions of passive PoE 24 VDC power sources shipped with 802.11a, 802.11g and 802.11n-based radios are commonly 100 Mbit/s only.
- 48 V, used in telecom.

12 V, 18 V, and 54 V are also used. The maximum current is generally 1 A or 2 A.

Passive PoE power sources include switches and injectors, just like standard (active) PoE have. The injectors can be powered from AC or DC.

Passive PoE-powered devices include not only natively PoE-aware devices, but also devices that are powered through splitters. For example, one splitter converts a wide range of passive PoE voltages to 5 volts.

== Power capacity limits ==
The ISO/IEC TR 29125 and Cenelec EN 50174-99-1 draft standards outline the cable bundle temperature rise that can be expected from the use of 4PPoE. A distinction is made between two scenarios:

1. bundles heating up from the inside to the outside, and
2. bundles heating up from the outside to match the ambient temperature.

The second scenario largely depends on the environment and installation, whereas the first is solely influenced by the cable construction. In a standard unshielded cable, the PoE-related temperature rise increases by a factor of 5. In a shielded cable, this value drops to between 2.5 and 3, depending on the design.

== Pinouts ==
802.3af/at/bt pin assignments from the Power Sourcing Equipment (PSE) perspective (MDI-X)
Pins at switch	T568A color	T568B color	10/100 mode B, DC on spares		10/100 mode A, DC & data		1000 mode B, DC & bi-data		1000 mode A, DC & bi-data		1000 mode A+B (4PPoE), DC & bi-data (Note: Only supported by 802.3bt for devices that identify as the newly added Type 3 or Type 4.)	
Pin 1	green stripe	orange stripe	Rx +		Rx +	DC +	TxRx A +		TxRx A +	DC +	TxRx A +	DC +
Pin 2	solid green	solid orange	Rx −		Rx −	DC +	TxRx A −		TxRx A −	DC +	TxRx A −	DC +
Pin 3	orange stripe	green stripe	Tx +		Tx +	DC −	TxRx B +		TxRx B +	DC −	TxRx B +	DC −
Pin 4	solid blue			DC +	Unused		TxRx C +	DC +	TxRx C +		TxRx C +	DC +
Pin 5	blue stripe			DC +	Unused		TxRx C −	DC +	TxRx C −		TxRx C −	DC +
Pin 6	solid orange	solid green	Tx −		Tx −	DC −	TxRx B −		TxRx B −	DC −	TxRx B −	DC −
Pin 7	brown stripe			DC −	Unused		TxRx D +	DC −	TxRx D +		TxRx D +	DC −
Pin 8	solid brown			DC −	Unused		TxRx D −	DC −	TxRx D −		TxRx D −	DC −
