= Jakhongir Artikkhodjayev =

Uzbek politician (born 1975)

- Jahongir Abidovich Ortiqxoʻjayev
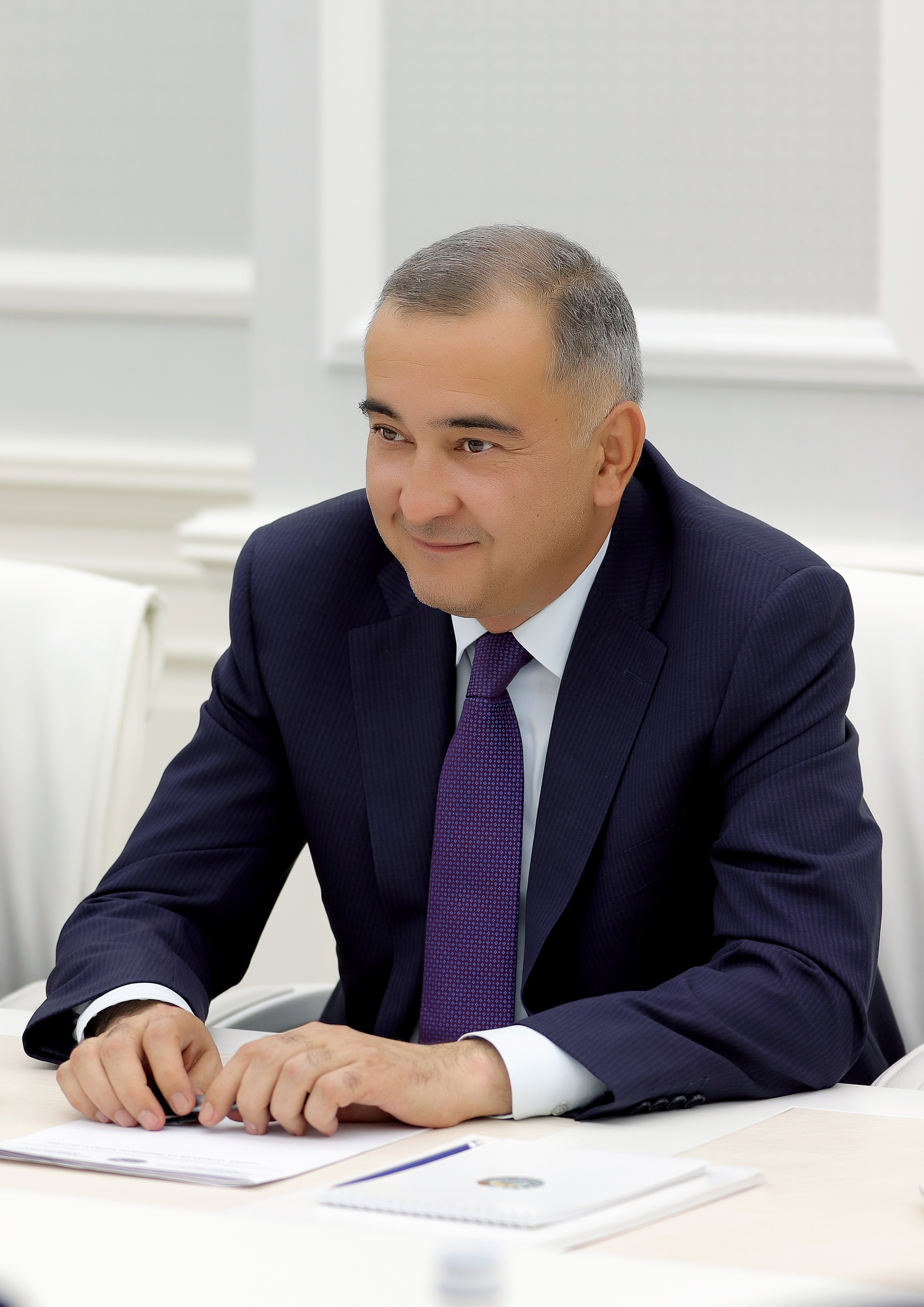

Mayor (Khokim) of Tashkent
- Incumbent
- In office 21 December 2018 – 16 January 2023

Senator of the Republic of Uzbekistan
- Incumbent
- Assumed office 9 September 2018

Personal details
- Born: 2 January 1975 (age 51) Tashkent, Uzbek SSR
- Citizenship: Soviet Union (1975-1991), Republic of Uzbekistan (1991 onwards)
- Education: Tashkent State University of Economics
- Awards: Order of Friendship (Uzbekistan)

Jahongir Abidovich Artikkhodjaev (Russian: Джахонги́р Аби́дович Артыкходжа́ев; Uzbek: Jahongir Abidovich Ortiqxoʻjayev) is former the Mayor (Khokim) of Tashkent City and founder of AKFA Group.

He was appointed to his post on 21 December 2018, having been acting Khokim since April 26, 2018. He is also a senator of the Republic of Uzbekistan, and he is Chair of the Yoga Federation of the Republic of Uzbekistan.

Before entering politics, Artikkhodjaev was an entrepreneur, and has founded several large businesses including AKFA and Artel. Since entering politics, he has no management involvement in these business interests.

== Early life and business career ==
Artikkhodjaev was born on January 2, 1975, in Tashkent, Uzbekistan. He graduated from the Tashkent State University of Economics in 1996.

In the early 1990s, when he was 17 years old Artikkhodjaev opened his first company, Jahongir LLC; a hairdressers and a shoe shop. In 1994, Artikkhodjaev opened his first car service centre, and began selling aluminium profiles, the latter of which became a cornerstone of his subsequent business development.

In 2001, Artikkhodjaev founded the AKFA Company which started as a company for reselling imported profiles, in cooperation with the Turkish company Akpa. In 2010, the AKFA group of companies began the production of profiles for windows and doors in Tashkent.

In 2011, Artikkhodjaev founded the Artel Group to produce electronics and household appliances. The company was funded from capital from the success of AKFA, and started with a small factory in Tashkent. In the same year, the company partnered with international companies including Samsung, for whom Artel began producing vacuum cleaners in Nukus. The company has since become the largest manufacturer of household appliances and electronics in Central Asia.

In 2015, he was awarded the Order of Dustlik by the President of Uzbekistan.

== As mayor of Tashkent ==
In 2018, Artikkhodjaev was unanimously approved to the post of Mayor of Tashkent. President Shavkat Mirziyoyev nominated him to the role, stating that Artikkhodjaev's success as an entrepreneur made him the most suitable candidate for the job. The President further stated to a group of investors in 2018: "I trust tomorrow only to entrepreneurs. Therefore, I made a decision: the entrepreneur is the Khokim of Tashkent."

In taking his position as Mayor, Artykkodjaev has also noted that he feels “great responsibility taking into account the great trust” he has been given. He stated “I give my word that I will work to eradicate cases of corruption, I will serve fairly, every day, every hour, every minute I will pay attention to ensuring that people live in prosperity and contentment, to solve their socio-political problems.”

Since Artikkhodjaev took up his position, according to the State Statistics Committee, the GDP of Tashkent increased from 15.3 trillion soums in 2019 to 23.7 trillion soums in 2021.

On January 30, 2023, Jakhongir Artikkhodjaev was excluded from the number of senators of the Senate of the Oliy Majlis of the Republic of Uzbekistan

=== Youth and education ===
Since 2020, the Khokimyat has organised a Youth Forum in Tashkent to engage with young people and to invigorate the active role of young people in their community. In his words, "If we close down completely, our lives, especially for young people, will become darkness. I think that young people deserve a serious step. Someone has to take a step, start it gradually." The forum took place alongside the Agency for Youth Affairs and the Youth Union of Uzbekistan. In 2020, around 10,000 people registered for the forum. The 2021 edition included sessions on women's rights and environmental issues.In September 2021, Artikkhodjaev announced that the Khokimyat was introducing a special scholarship for five school students and their teachers. The “Khokimyat” scholarship would reward 5 students and their teachers for 9 months of the academic year.

=== Sport ===
Artikkhodjaev has been an outspoken promoter of sport in Tashkent. One of the capital's football teams, Paktakhor Football Club was transferred from national ownership to the oversight of the Khokimyat. 8 other Super League Football cubs and 4 Pro League Teams were transferred to the jurisdiction of various khokimyats and state companies. Following successful development of the club, it is expected to attract will new sponsors and in the future be sold. Following the mayoralty's taking over the club, Artikkhodjaev noted that from now on the activities and financial statements of the Pakhtakor football club will be conducted transparently and openly. It is reported that the salary arrears to the players and staff of the club have been repaid at the expense of 22 billion soums allocated by sponsors. The Khokimyat stated that they would create “all necessary conditions” for the development of the club, with a focus on the academy and development of young players.

In 2022, Tashkent hosted the World Judo Championships. Artikkhodjaev is also Chair of the Yoga Federation of the Republic of Uzbekistan. In 2020 the Rederation opened a new full-time office in Tashkent. Artikkhodjaev stated: “We will open all the possibilities in our power for the development of yoga in Uzbekistan.“

=== Support for business ===
Artikkhodjaev has a pro-business stance, and has expressed a desire to turn Tashkent into the Business Capital of Central Asia. Between 2020 and 2021, it was reported that the number of businesses registered in the country increased by 80,914, or over 20% in comparison to June 2020.

A number of “Business Cities” are also under construction in Tashkent. These include the Yunusobad Business City and the Mirzo-Ulugbek Business City. An International Financial Center is expected to be built in Tashkent in the near future on the territory of UzExpoCentre. In 2021, the Government announced a plan to increase the area of retail space in Tashkent by 10 times, move heavy industry enterprises out of the city.

In 2019, Texnopark in Tashkent was developed to work with advanced technology, and now produces Samsung refrigerators.

=== Green initiative ===
In 2019 Artikkhodjaev launched the Green Initiative, which encourages citizens to get involved in tree-planting throughout Tashkent. Under the scheme, the khokimyat provides seedlings to be planted in specially designated areas. According to the campaign, over 400,000 seedlings were to be planted.

=== COVID-19 ===
In response to the COVID-19 pandemic in Uzbekistan, the Tashkent Khokimyat initiated the construction of an emergency distribution centre with over 500 beds, designed to receive patients with COVID-19. A large-scale quarantine center was built, to house those arriving from abroad.

=== Infrastructure ===
The Mayoralty has been engaged in considerable urban renewal projects since 2018. This includes the renewal of the Capital's roads and canals, bridges, development of parks and recreational areas, as well as social housing. However, the Khokhim has stated “we are building a new metropolis, but we do not want to turn it into a faceless city of glass and concrete”.

=== Tourism development ===
Artikkhodjaev is trying to promote tourism in Tashkent, saying he wished to use the model of Dubai as a success story in the development of tourism. The khokimyat is carrying out a series of consultations with businesses and key stakeholders, that will feed into a forward-looking strategy on to make Tashkent a more attractive tourist destination.

=== Other ===
In 2020, Artikkhodjaev visited Nukus to partner with the city's Mayoralty. The aim of the visit was to share Tashkent's experience in order to help develop Nukus as a modern city.

== Other ==
=== Journalist controversy ===
On November 16, 2019, a doctored audio recording of a conversation appeared, in which Artikkhodjaev allegedly threatened the journalists appeared on the website of the publication Kun.uz.

According to this recording, which was subsequently found to be doctored, Artikkhodjaev threatened journalists with sudden "disappearance" in case of refusal to cooperate. Following investigation, the Mayor was cleared of any wrongdoing, although it was deemed that his words were rude and inappropriate.

Furthermore, KUN.uz's journalistic and editorial team were found to be in violation of the law both in the recording and of the distribution, naming the publication's journalistic and editorial team. The Prosecutor's Office noted that the recording was taken and distributed to create negative PR against the Khokim. “On November 16, 2019, an unknown person, in order to discredit the Khokim Jahongir Artikkhodjaev, distributed on social networks a recording lasting one and a half minutes (the meeting lasted two hours), edited from inappropriate words.”

Kun.Uz later published a correction in its article, admitting that the original recording was heavily edited and not representative of the conversation.

=== Development of business environment ===
In recent years, the business environment in Uzbekistan has rapidly transformed to allow businesses to grow and become more transparent. Prior to 2018, many of Artikkhodjaev's businesses grew as a set of smaller companies that correlated in activity and geography with the business activity, including several companies operating overseas. This is because the traditional holding group structure did not exist in Uzbek law. These restrictions and solutions applied to every private business in Uzbekistan.

Tashkent City

Tashkent City is one of the largest urban redevelopment projects to be carried out in Uzbekistan. The development is in the heart of the city, and includes the construction of over 80 hectares of park, hotels, business district and shopping malls. The area had been underdeveloped area of Tashkent for many years, and Artikkhodjaev stated that he was directed to complete the redevelopment of the landplot in under three years. In order to do so he spoke to over 700 investors, but no one agreed.

Therefore, it was domestic companies that developed the site as a Private Public Partnership (PPP). This includes companies Murad Buildings (developing Nest One) and Central Plaza by Real House, as well as companies founded by Artikkodjaev. Other investors include SQB Bank, Asaka Bank and AloqaBank. Implementation partners include Uzbekneftegaz, Arup and Cushman and Wakefield.
