= Adtran =

American telecommunications equipment company

Adtran, Inc.

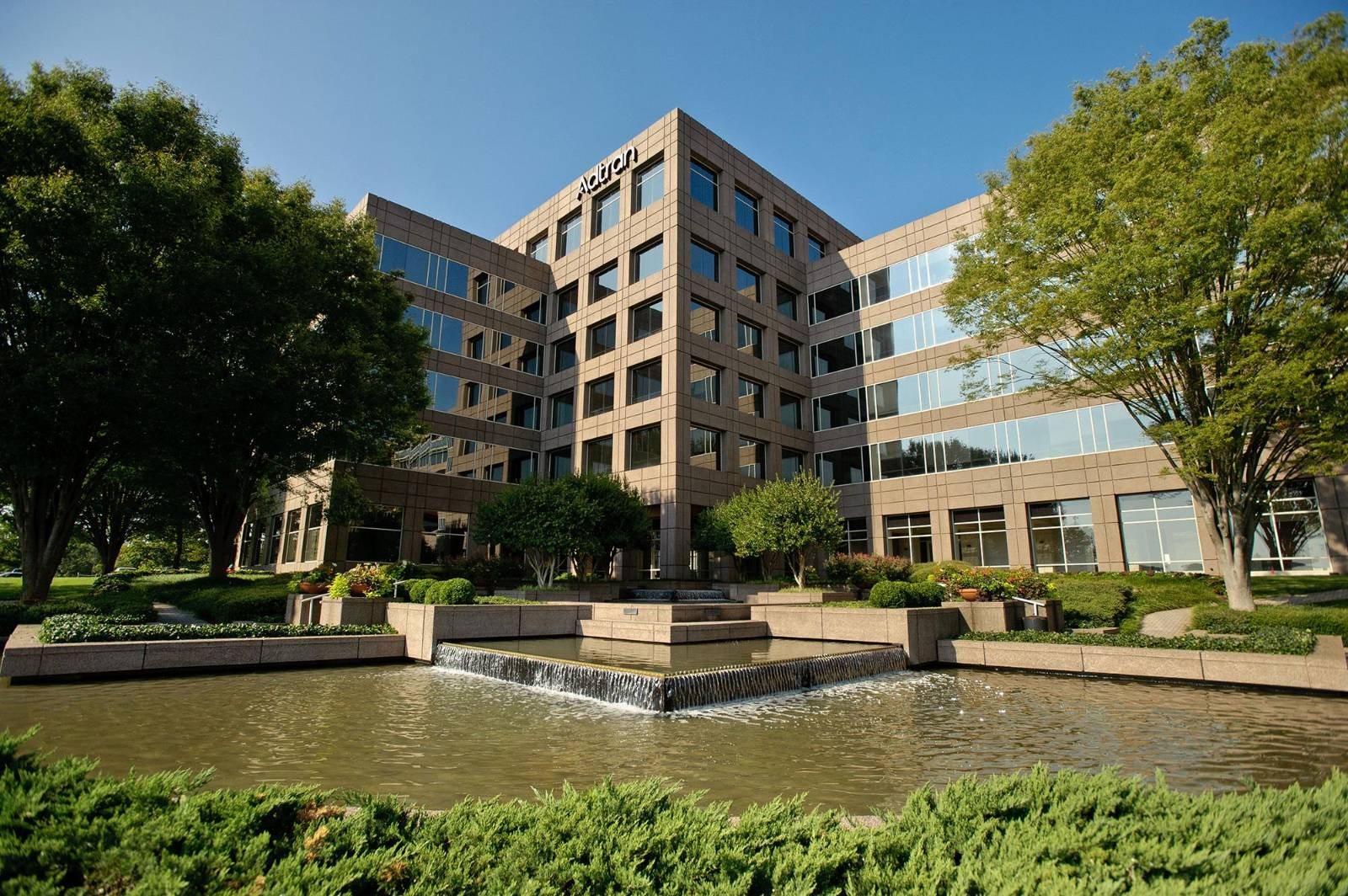
- Headquarters – Huntsville, Alabama, United States
- Type: Public
- Traded as: Nasdaq: ADTN; FWB: QH9; SDAX component
- ISIN: US00486H1059
- Industry: Telecommunications; Fiber Networking; Voice and Data Equipment
- Founded: 1985; 41 years ago
- Headquarters: Huntsville, Alabama, US
- Key people: Tom Stanton (CEO)
- Revenue: ▲US$1.08 Billion (FY 2025)
- Operating income: ▲US$-15.6 Million (up from -$427.6 Million in FY 2024)(FY 2025)
- Net income: ▲US$-45.7 Million (up from -US$459.9 Million in FY 2024) (FY 2025)
- Total assets: ▲US$1.2 Billion (FY 2025)
- Total equity: ▲US$145.8 Million (up from $126.9 Million in FY 2024)(FY 2025)
- Number of employees: 3,338
- Parent: ADTRAN Holding
- Website: adtran.com

Adtran, Inc. is an American fiber networking and telecommunications company headquartered in Huntsville, Alabama. It is a vendor of both residential and enterprise networking equipment, along with administrative software for network management and deployment. Its customers include communications service providers, governments, enterprises and utilities.

== History ==
Adtran was founded in 1985 by Mark C. Smith, Lonnie S. McMillian, and Larry Owen, and began operations in 1986, following the AT&T divestiture of the Regional Bell Operating Companies (RBOCs). It supplied network equipment to both the RBOCs and independent telephone companies in the United States.

In 2006, Adtran acquired Luminous Networks, a manufacturer of access network equipment. In 2011, it acquired Bluesocket, a maker of enterprise Wi-Fi equipment based in Burlington, Massachusetts. In 2012, it acquired Nokia Siemens Networks' broadband access business based in Germany. In 2016, it acquired CommScope's active fiber business. In 2018, Adtran acquired connected home software provider SmartRG from Vancouver, WA.

In 2021, Adtran entered into a business combination with ADVA Optical Networking, a cloud and mobile services networking company based in Munich and Meiningen in Germany. In 2022, Adtran acquired the remaining shares of Cambridge Communication Systems (CCS) Limited, a developer of wireless backhaul and transport systems for small cells. It offers an mmWave Gigabit fiber extension system along with web-based management software for planning, configuring and monitoring networks. In 2024, Adtran self-certified itself "Buy America-compliant" with the U.S. Department of Commerce. This list acts as a reference for communications service providers applying for Broadband Equity Access and Deployment (BEAD) funding.

== Notable products ==
50G PON: Adtran's implementation of 50Gbit/s passive optical network (PON) technology includes its SDX 6400 Series of optical line terminals.

Quantum key distribution (QKD): In collaboration with Orange, Adtran demonstrated a 400Gbit/s data transmission system using QKD. The hybrid approach integrated quantum-safe encryption with classical cryptographic methods to secure data across a 184 km system.

Optical cesium atomic clocks: Adtran's Oscilloquartz division has introduced atomic clocks that leverage optical pumping technology. The improved accuracy and stability of these devices exceed the current ITU-T G.811.1 Enhanced Primary Reference Clock (ePRC) specification. The current highest-end clocks in this range can combine with core grandmaster devices to maintain 100 nanosecond precision for up to 100 days.

Mosaic One: Mosaic One is a cloud-based software-as-a-service platform that aggregates data from management systems, broadband access and in-home devices to support network operations and customer care.

== Locations ==
Adtran's corporate headquarters is located in Huntsville, Alabama, in Cummings Research Park. It has international offices located in:

- Melbourne, Australia
- Berlin and Greifswald, Germany
- Hyderabad, India
- Tel Aviv, Israel
- Milan, Italy
- Riyadh, Saudi Arabia
- Bratislava, Slovakia
- Tunis, Tunisia
- Basingstoke, Hampshire, United Kingdom
- Adastral Park, Ipswich, United Kingdom
- Gdynia, Poland
- Warsaw, Poland
- Munich, Bavaria, Germany
- York, North Yorkshire, United Kingdom

== Merger with ADVA Optical Networking ==
Adtran's 2022 business combination with ADVA expanded its portfolio to include end-to-end data transport products, complementing its existing focus on access networking equipment. The merger also gave Adtran ownership of ADVA's subsidiary, Oscilloquartz, a manufacturer of timing and synchronization solutions based in Switzerland.

== Certifications ==
Adtran is certified for ISO 9001, ISO 14001, ISO 27001 and TL 9000.
