= AKFA Group =

Uzbek industrial holding

- Website: https://akfagroup.com/eng/index

AKFA Group is an industrial holding company specializing in the production of plastic and aluminum profiles, windows, heating systems, and construction materials. It is one of the largest private companies in Uzbekistan, with its headquarters in Tashkent. The company was founded by Jakhongir Artikkhodjaev, who was appointed mayor of Tashkent in 2018. CEO of the group is Kamran Gulamov.

== History ==
The company was founded in the early 2000s.

In 2006, AKFA launched its own line for the production of aluminum profiles. In 2011, AKFA Group launched its first plant in Central Asia for the production of aluminum and bimetallic sectional radiators. In 2012, the UAE-based Emirates Extrusion Factory (EEF) acquired an extrusion aluminum profile plant from AKFA Group, located in the Jebel Ali Free Economic Zone.

In 2015, Green Line Profil LLC was established, and a plant for the production of aluminum profiles by extrusion method BENKAM was launched in the Navoiy Free Economic Zone. The total investment volume was over $39 million, and the production capacity of the new plant was 36,000 tons per year. In 2019, the plant was visited by the President of Uzbekistan, Shavkat Mirziyoyev.

In 2019, the company began production of metal welded meshes and granite products. In January of the same year, the mayor of Tashkent, Artykhodjaev, announced that he had stepped down from AKFA management. Abror Ganiev was appointed a new chairman of the board of directors of AKFA Group of companies.

In 2021, it became known that AKFA Group is the producer of exterior details for Uzbekistan's tallest skyscraper, Nest One.

Akfa Group collaborates with German conglomerate Xella to produce autoclaved aerated concrete under the Ytong brand at its manufacturing facilities.

In 2023, the AKFA Group purchased a 50% stake of Feed up fast food chain.

In May 2026, AKFA Aluminum, announced the start of construction of its new aluminum manufacturing facility in Bowling Green, Kentucky. Using recycled aluminum billets in the extrusion processes to create products, and supplying materials for global markets including construction, transportation, and renewable energy, and creating 331 jobs.

== Charitable work ==
In 2021, the company opened Uzbekistan's first privately constructed shelter for homeless dogs.

In 2022, the company spent over 80 billion UZS to support low-income residents, fund children's medical operations, sponsor sports, etc.; the company also partners with the Ishonch Foundation to aid children with cancer.
