= PowerDsine =

Semiconductor company

PowerDsine Ltd
- Industry: Semiconductor, Networking equipment
- Founded: 1994, Israel
- Founders: Igal Rotem; Ilan Atias
- Successor: Microsemi
- Headquarters: Hod HaSharon, Israel
- Products: Power over Ethernet, xDSL power feeding, Reverse Power Feeding, Ringing (telephony) generators
- Revenue: ▼$38.6 million USD(2005)
- Net income: ▲$0.751 million USD (2005)
- Website: www.microsemi.com

PowerDsine was a semiconductor and systems company, acquired by Microsemi in January 2007 following its IPO in 2004. Microchip Technology acquired Microsemi in 2018. Established in 1994, PowerDsine's initial products were telephone ringing generators, and it also developed DSL remote power feeding modules, before inventing Power over Ethernet's (PoE) precursor Power over LAN.

PowerDsine, a prominent company in the field of Power over Ethernet (PoE) technologies, supplied a range of products including PoE Injectors, which are devices that add power to Ethernet cables for powering network devices. Additionally, they provided specialized PoE Test Equipment to ensure the proper functioning of PoE installations, and PoE Integrated Circuits (ICs) for embedding PoE capabilities into various network devices.
