= Microsemi =

California-based semiconductor company

Microsemi Corporation
- Type: Public
- Traded as: Nasdaq: MSCC
- Industry: Semiconductor; Networking equipment
- Founded: February 1959; 67 years ago Culver City, CA, United States
- Founders: Arthur Feldon; Steve Manning
- Defunct: May 29, 2018
- Fate: Acquired by Microchip Technology
- Headquarters: Aliso Viejo, CA, United States
- Area served: Worldwide
- Key people: James J. Peterson, CEO & Chairman; Paul H. Pickle, COO & President
- Products: FPGA, System on a chip, RAID, host adapter, NVMe controllers, Power over Ethernet, Time server, Atomic Clock, PLL, Frequency synthesizer, MMIC, Varactor, PIN diode, Audio processor, Ethernet Switch, Ethernet PHY, Transceiver, GaN Transistors, SiC MosFET, power module
- Revenue: ▲USD1,655 million (2016)
- Operating income: ▼USD53.70 million (2016)
- Net income: ▼ (USD32.60) million (2016)
- Number of employees: 4,400 (2016)
- Website: www.microsemi.com

Microsemi Corporation was an Aliso Viejo, California-based provider of semiconductor and system solutions for aerospace & defense, communications, data center and industrial markets.

In February 2018, it was announced that Chandler, Arizona-based Microchip Technology was acquiring the company for over US$10 billion, pending regulatory approval. In May 2018, it was announced that Microchip had completed its acquisition of Microsemi.

== History ==
=== 1959 to 1970: Early years ===
Microsemi was founded in February 1959 in Culver City, California as MicroSemiconductor. It incorporated in Delaware on September 27, 1960. A trade catalog and price lists from this early period can be found at the Smithsonian Institution. In March 1963, A. Feldon represented Microsemiconductor Corp in the Advisory Panel of Suppliers at the IEEE session on "Components for Miniaturized Electronic Assemblies".
According to the Missiles and Rockets magazine, in 1964 "Molecular packaging of integrated circuits has been suggested by Microsemiconductor Corp. This would involve the same process the company uses for diodes it supplies to the Improved Minuteman program." Microsemiconductor is cited in 1965 as supplier of miniature silicon diodes that are "ideal to use as beam profile detectors or to measure depth-dose distribution of small collimated beams." by University of California's Ernest O. Lawrence Radiation Laboratory. In 1966, two of the company's engineers, E.S. Resnond and M.W. Stillwell, published a Production Engineering Measures Study, on High Voltage Oscillators. As of 1969, Microsemiconductor's address was still 11250 Plaza Court, Culver City, CA 90230.
On August 13, 1969, Standard Resources Corporation, from Copiague, New York, a close-end management investment company, filed at the U.S. Securities and Exchange Commission a request to merge with Microsemiconductor. This request disclosed that the major shareholders of Microsemiconductor as of May 31, 1969, were Arthur Feldon (31%), Steve Manning (31%) and Thomas C. Hall (10%). At the end of the proposed merger the company would retain the name Microsemiconductor. At the time, J.M. Kaplan's JemKap Inc owned 37.7% of the outstanding common shares of Standard, which would make him the owner of 18.9% of the surviving company. Standard Resources and Microsemiconductor merged in November 1969.

=== 1971 to 2000: The Philip Frey Jr years ===
According to the Orange County Business Journal, "In 1971, the New York operation was spun off and Philip Frey Jr. was brought on from Teledyne Inc.'s semiconductor division in Hawthorne to head Microsemiconductor. At the time, the company had annual sales of about $500,000, almost entirely to defense industry customers. In 1972, the company moved from Culver City to Santa Ana, California. Microsemi still was almost exclusively a defense business in 1987, but by then sales were close to $50 million. That same year, the company did a $35 million convertible bond offering, the proceeds of which were used to acquire about a dozen companies, most of them struggling "bargain" buys. When the acquisitions began straining profitability, Frey didn't waste a lot of time admitting his mistake. In 1989, Microsemi began selling them off. Sales, which hit a then-high of $104 million in 1989, fell to $83 million by 1991. But they've grown almost every year since and are expected by analysts to exceed $150 million for the fiscal year just ended. (1996)"

On July 1, 1982, Jemkap Inc acquired 48.6% of Microsemiconductor Class A Stock., and Microsemisemiconductor acquired the Siemens Components Group in Scottsdale, Arizona.

Microsemiconductor renamed itself to Microsemi, in February 1983.

On March 9, 1986, Microsemi, at the time a supplier of "high-performance semiconductor diodes in a variety of military, industrial and commercial products", issued 2.5 million shares of common stock. Up until this time, Jacob M Kaplan of New York owned or controlled 38.4% of the company shares, and was 94 years-old. Microsemi raised $26 million in the stock sale. Jacob Merril Kaplan, who was a philanthropist, died in Manhattan, NY on July 20, 1987.

Microsemi was originally traded Over the Counter, commonly traded as MicrSm. On March 1, 1990, Microsemi joined the NASDAQ exchange.

On March 1, 1987, Microsemi sold $35M in convertible debentures.

Between 1986 and 1990 Microsemi acquired over 60% of the shares of 11 companies.

In June 1991 Microsemi created two join-ventures in Taiwan for packaging in Taiwan its component dies made in Santa Ana, California. Microsemi established its presence in Ireland in 1992 through the acquisition of a facility in Ennis Co. Clare. The Ennis facility's key competencies are the development, manufacturing and high reliability testing of semiconductors to meet stringent aerospace, satellite, medical and security standards.

In July 1992 Microsemi acquired Unitrode's semiconductor products division.

In February 1993 Microsemi's stock crashed 54%, because of a cash crunch. "Microsemi has been restructuring for several years as defense budget cuts have slowed its sales. In 1989, the company said it planned to sell or close 10 subsidiaries not related to its core business of manufacturing computer chips for use in electronics equipment ranging from military weapons to heart pacemakers. The company sold four subsidiaries, shut down one, combined two and retained three. The company took $20.5 million in write-offs during the past three years in connection with the restructuring."

In April 1994 Microsemi formed a joint venture in China with Shanghai Electrical Apparatus, with 60% of the joint-venture belonging to Microsemi.

Linfinity, whose CEO was Jim Peterson, was the first Integrated Circuit company acquired by Microsemi, in 1999.

=== 2000 to 2018: The James J. Peterson years ===
On November 30, 2000, Microsemi promoted Jim Peterson to president and CEO. Jim Peterson was previously the president of Linfinity.

In 2001 Microsemi relocated its headquarters from Santa Ana, California to Irvine, California.

Between 2006 and 2010, Microsemi acquired a mix of space/hi-reliability focused companies (MDT, TSI, Babcock, Spectrum Microwave), defense/security focused companies (Endwave, White Electronics, Arxan, Brijot, AML), and also companies focused in discrete and IC power products for commercial applications (Advanced Power Technology, PowerDsine, Nexsem), as well as communications focused companies (PowerDsine, VT Silicon, Zarlink) a programmable logic company (Actel) and an ASIC design house focused on analog mixed-signal (ASIC Advantage).

In 2011 Microsemi relocated its headquarters from Irvine, California to Aliso Viejo, California.

In August 2012, Microsemi marked its 20 years of operations in Ireland by naming Ennis its European headquarters. It also announced the inaugural Microsemi Scholarship in engineering at the University of Limerick. In addition, the company funded a high-profile science and aerospace engineering programme in St. Flannan's school in Ennis. Microsemi works closely with the Industrial Development Authority (IDA Ireland), which is responsible for attracting and developing overseas investment in Ireland. Support from IDA Ireland was a key factor in the company's decision to invest in the region.

Between 2012 and 2013 Microsemi acquired Timing companies (the timing business of Maxim Integrated Products, Symmetricom) in addition to Zarlink.

In November 2013, Jim Peterson promoted Paul Pickle to COO and president, retaining the CEO position, and accumulating the position of chairman of the board.

In 2014 Microsemi established a design group in Cork, Ireland, through the acquisition of Mingoa, which is focused on advanced system-on-chip (SoC) software and solutions with an emphasis on ARM processor-centric designs.

Between 2014 and 2015, Microsemi acquired communications and data-center focused companies (Mingoa, Centellax, Vitesse, PMC-Sierra).

In March 2016, Microsemi announced the divestiture of the defense-focused business units acquired between 2009 and 2011.

In April 2016 Microsemi announced the divestiture of its Broadband Wireless Division, which was previously part of PMC-Sierra for $21 million.

In October 2017, Microsemi announced the acquisition of the timing business of Vectron International from Knowles for $130 million.

In March 2018, Microsemi's PolarFire FPGA was named "2017 Product of the Year" by Electronic Products China and 21ic.com.

In March 2018 Microchip Technology announced it would acquire Microsemi for approximately $10 billion.

== Products ==
Microsemi has been producing various electronic products, including high-performance and radiation-hardened analog mixed-signal integrated circuits, FPGAs, SoCs and ASICs; power management products; timing and synchronization devices and precise time solutions, voice processing devices; RF solutions; discrete components; enterprise storage and communication solutions, security technologies and scalable anti-tamper products; Ethernet solutions; Power-over-Ethernet ICs.

Microsemi has provided semiconductor solutions for numerous U.S. space programs dating back to the launch of the first Atlas rocket. Several of Microsemi's space products were used in the historic landing of the Mars Curiosity Rover in 2012. Microsemi products were also used for mission critical applications such as launch systems, avionics, telemetry, navigation, drive control, mission computers, cameras and other instruments.

FPGAs and SoCs

- Flash-based FPGAs and SoCs from 5K to 150KLUTs
- Space-grade FPGAs
- Space-grade Analog Front end for FPGAs

Storage

- RAID Controllers and Adaptec SAS/SATA host adaptors
- HBA Controllers and Adaptec SAS/SATA host adaptors
- SAS/SATA Switches and Adaptec Expanders
- Flashtec NVMe Controllers
- Flashtec NVMRAM Drives
- Switchtec PCIe switches

Ethernet and Network processors

- Ethernet Switches
- Ethernet PHYs
- Ethernet Software
- Winpath Network Processors

Optical Products

- Optical Transport Network (OTN) products
- Optical Line Drivers

Power over Ethernet

- PoE Injectors
- PoE Switches
- PoE PSE ICs
- PoE PD ICs

Audio and Voice

- Timberwolf Audio processors
- SLIC

Timing & Synchronization

- Time servers
- Atomic clocks
- Rugged Oscillators
- PLL
- Frequency synthesizers
- Precision Time Protocol Grand Masters and Software

Power Management

- Switching and Linear Voltage regulator
- Electronic Fuses
- Ideal Solar Bypass Devices
- Space-grade Power supply

Power Discretes and Modules

- SiC Diodes, MOSFETs and power modules
- IGBTs
- BJTs, Diodes and JFETs

RF Transceivers

- Ultra Low Power Wearable Radio
- Implantable Radio

WLAN RF Front End

- Power Amplifiers
- LNAs
- FEMs

RF/Microwave Discretes

- MMICs
- PIN diodes
- Varactors
- Gunn diodes
- Gallium nitride transistors

Circuit Protection

- Transient-voltage-suppression diodes
- Medical Surge Protection

== Acquisitions ==
=== 1980s acquisitions ===
- 2H 1982: Siemens Components Group (Scottsdale, Arizona)
- July 1986: Bikor, divested in July 1993
- July 1986: RPM Enterprises
- June 1987: Solitron's Rectifier Assembly Unit
- July 1987: Hybrid Components Inc
- August 1987: Diodes Incorporated (20%), divested in January 1990
- September 1987: Vitarel (60%)
- August 1987: Omni Technology, divested in December 1993 to Technology Marketing
- September 1987: Salem Scientific (a.k.a. Sertech Labs)
- November 1987: Coors Porcelain (product line includes silicon wafers that can be used in Diodes Inc. products. Also produces high-performance diodes used in automobiles and microwave equipment.)
- January 1988:Surface Mounted Technology (80%)
- January 1988: General Microcircuits, divested in January 1998
- June 1989: Varo Quality Semiconductor

=== 1990s acquisitions ===
- July 1992: Unitrode (semiconductor Product Division)
- October 1996: SGS Thomson's Radio Frequency Semiconductor (High-reliability Products)
- October 1996: National Semiconductor (high reliability monolithic diode arrays)
- September 1997: PPC Products
- May 1998: BKC Semiconductors, shutdown in November 1999
- January 1998: Xemod (19%)
- April 1999: Linfinity Microelectronics division of Symmetricom
- June 1999: Narda Microwave Semiconductor

=== 2000s acquisitions ===
- February 2000: Infinesse (HBT Business Product Group)
- August 2001: New England Semiconductor
- August 2001: Compensated Devices
- April 2006: Advanced Power Technology (APT)
- January 2007: PowerDsine Ltd
- November 2007: MDT Corporation
- January 2008: TSI Microelectronics
- October 2008: Electro Module, Inc. and its wholly owned subsidiary, Babcock, Inc.
- April 2009: the Space Level Power Products business of Spectrum Microwave, Inc.
- April 2009: defense and security business of Endwave Corp, divested on May 2, 2016, to Mercury Systems.
- June 2009: Nexsem

=== 2010s acquisitions ===
- April 2010: White Electronic Designs Corp divested on May 2, 2016, to Mercury Systems.
- September 2010: VT Silicon
- September 2010: Arxan Technologies, Defense Systems, Inc., divested on May 2, 2016, to Mercury Systems.
- November 2010: Actel Corp.
- May 2011: AML Communications, divested on May 2, 2016, to Mercury Systems.
- June 2011: Brijot Imaging Systems, Inc.
- July 2011: ASIC Advantage, Inc.
- October 2011: Zarlink Semiconductor, Inc.
- January 2012: timing, synchronization, and synthesis business of Maxim Integrated Products
- October 2013: Symmetricom, Inc.
- July 2014: Mingoa
- September 2014: Centellax
- March 2015: Vitesse Semiconductor Corp.
- November 2015: PMC-Sierra for $2.5 Billion. Divested the Broadband Wireless Division to Maxlinear in April 2016.
- June 2017: Phonon
- November 2017: Vectron

== Awards ==
- SOLAR Industry Award 2010, for LX2400 IDEALSolar (Solar Bypass IC)
- Best Delivery Support Award 2011, ZTE Corporation
- Product of the Year Award 2011, Electronic Products, for SmartFusion (Mixed Signal FPGAs)
- Editor's Choice 2012, Military Embedded Systems Magazine
- Corporate Social Responsibility Award 2013, ITsAP Award
- Innovation Award 2013, EDN China for SmartFusion2
- Innovative Product/Technology 2013, OC Tech Alliance, for SmartFusion2 (SoC FPGA)
- CFO of the Year 2013, Business Journal and CalCPA
- Renewable Energy Design Award 2014, Elektra Awards, Electronics Weekly, for DC-powered PoE Midspan Injector (solar powered)
- Outstanding CEO in Technology 2014, OC Tech Alliance
- DesignVision Award 2014, DesignCon
- European Commission Innovation Award 2014, European Commission, for SOI-HITS Research Project (Smart Silicon-on-Insulator Sensing Systems Operating at High Temperature)
- Cryptography Research DPA Logo Certification, for FPGA/Rambus
- Public Outstanding Technology Company 2015, OC Tech Alliance
- Innovation Award for Best Telecom & Networking Product 2015, EDN China, for SimplyPHY VSC8502 (IC)
- Innovative Product/Software Application Award 2016, ESTnet, for MiniSIM
- Network Support Solutions ISCWest 2016 Award, Security Industry Association, for PDS-104GO 4-port Outdoor PoE Switch
- Favorite Analyst Semiconductor Company Award, 2016 Global Semiconductor Alliance Awards
- M2M Network Equipment Technology Company of the Year 2016 by IoT Breakthrough Awards
- China Electronic Market (CEM) magazine's 2016 Editor's Choice Award for the Adaptec® Series 8E RAID adapter
- Microsemi's PolarFire FPGA named "Product of the Year" by Electronic Product Magazine for its lowest power, cost-optimized mid-range PolarFire® field programmable gate array.
- Leading Lights 2018 Outstanding Components Vendor by Light Reading

== Controversies ==
=== James Peterson education claims ===
In 2009 Barry Minkow, co-founder of the Fraud Discovery Institute, published a report claiming that James Peterson, Microsemi's president and CEO, had not obtained a bachelor's degree or Master of Business Administration as he had listed on his biography on STEC Inc.'s regulatory filings (as part of his board position with that company) and on a U.S. government security clearance application. Peterson responded with a public statement saying he "categorically" denied the reports. The next day, the registrar of Brigham Young University advised that they had double-checked and had no records of Peterson ever having obtained any degrees. An independent inquiry was made on behalf of the board by the law firm Munger, Tolles & Olson, which confirmed that in fact Peterson had not earned either degree. As a penalty for misrepresenting his academic credentials, Peterson paid Microsemi a fine and forwent his 2008 bonus.

=== ProASIC3 backdoor claims ===
In 2012, researchers discovered a susceptibility in Microsemi's ProASIC3 to a new type of analysis based on differential power analysis, allowing extraction of an undocumented factory encryption key. A leaked draft copy of the conference paper claimed the vulnerability constituted an backdoor. The researchers claimed that several factory script files constituted proof the factory passcode constituted an intentional backdoor, but the contents of the scripts were not included in the report.

MicroSemi denied any intentional backdoor, but did confirm the existence of a factory passcode for testing, which can be overridden by the user's passcode. The MicroSemi response acknowledged the new analysis put all FPGA manufacturers at risk.

=== Pre-acquisition discounting ===
In August 2018, Microchip discovered that Microsemi shipped large orders to distributors on discount before the closing of the acquisition and had a culture of excessive extravagance.

== Offices ==
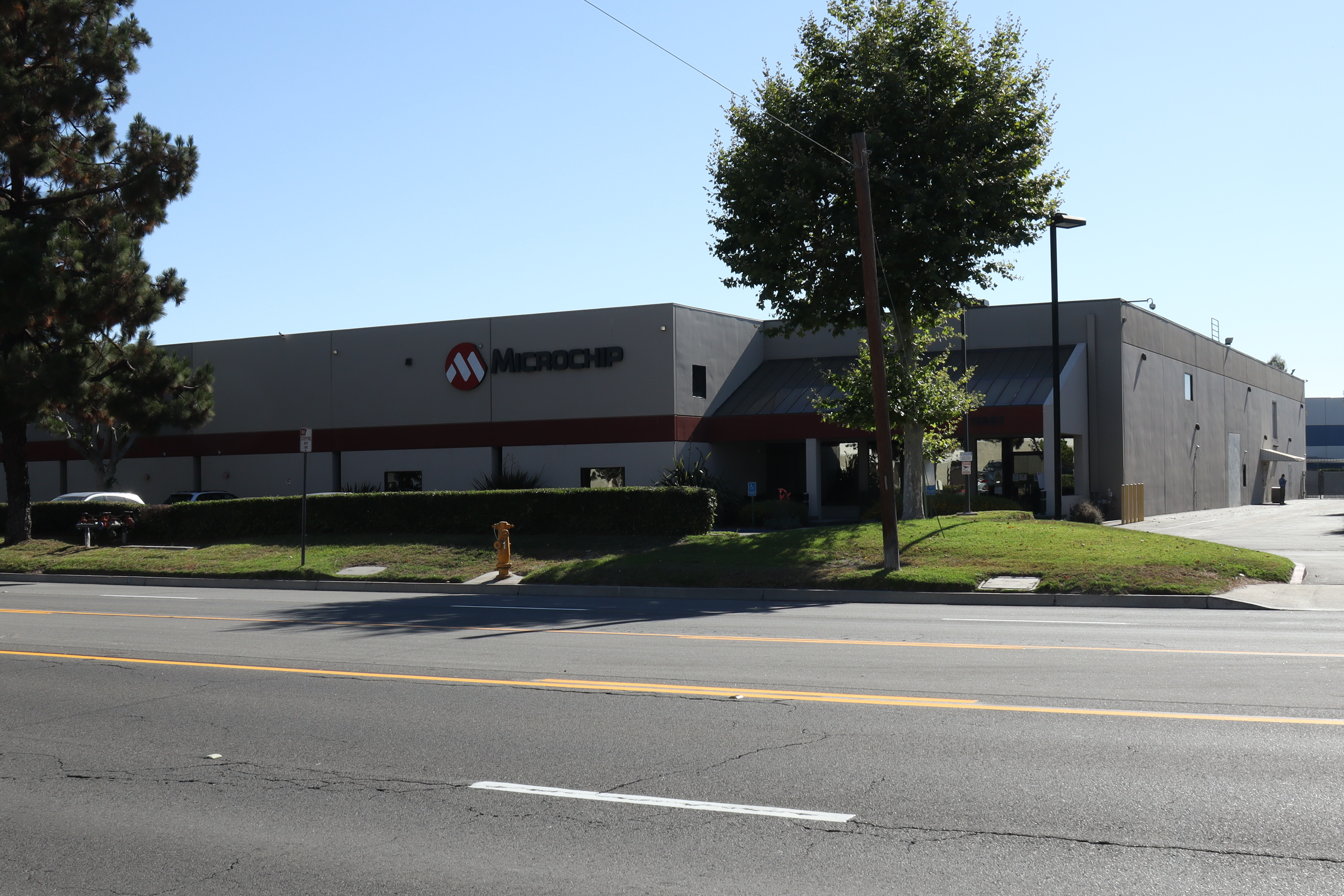
Microsemi (now Microchip) office in Garden Grove, California

Microsemi was headquartered in Aliso Viejo, California and had offices in California (Camarillo, Cupertino, Garden Grove, San Diego, San Jose, Santa Clara, Santa Rosa); Boulder, Colorado; Atlanta, Georgia; Beverly, Lawrence, and Lowell, Massachusetts; Allentown and Reading, Pennsylvania; Austin and Dallas, Texas; Ottawa, Canada; Macau, Shanghai and Shenzhen, China; Herlev, Denmark; Bruges, Belgium; Ennis, Ireland; Hod HaSharon, Israel; Manila and Cabuyao, Philippines; Caldicot, United Kingdom; and Hyderabad, India. This list does not include properties acquired together with PMC-Sierra.
