= Vitesse Semiconductor =

Fabless American semiconductor company

- Company type: Subsidiary of Microsemi
- Traded as: Formerly Nasdaq: VTSS
- Industry: Communication Equipment
- Founded: 1984
- Headquarters: Camarillo, California
- Key people: Chris Gardner (CEO)
- Website: www.vitesse.com

Vitesse Semiconductor was a fabless American semiconductor company based in Camarillo, California, which developed high-performance Ethernet integrated circuits solutions for Carrier, Enterprise networks. On March 18, 2015, Microsemi Corporation and Vitesse Semiconductor Corporation jointly announced that Microsemi would acquire Vitesse. The acquisition closed on April 28, 2015. Microchip Technology acquired Microsemi on May 29, 2018.

== Corporate history ==
Vitesse was founded by Dr. Alfred S. Joseph, 1984, as Vitesse Electronics Corporation. Its founders came out of Rockwell International and were funded $30 million from the Norton corporation. Dr. Joseph later raised venture capital from Sequoia Capital and New Enterprise Associates. Vitesse later changed its name to Vitesse Semiconductor in 1987. It became a public company, with its 1991 initial public offering. In 1999, Vitesse acquired XaQti and in 2000, acquired Sitera and Orologic.

== Products ==
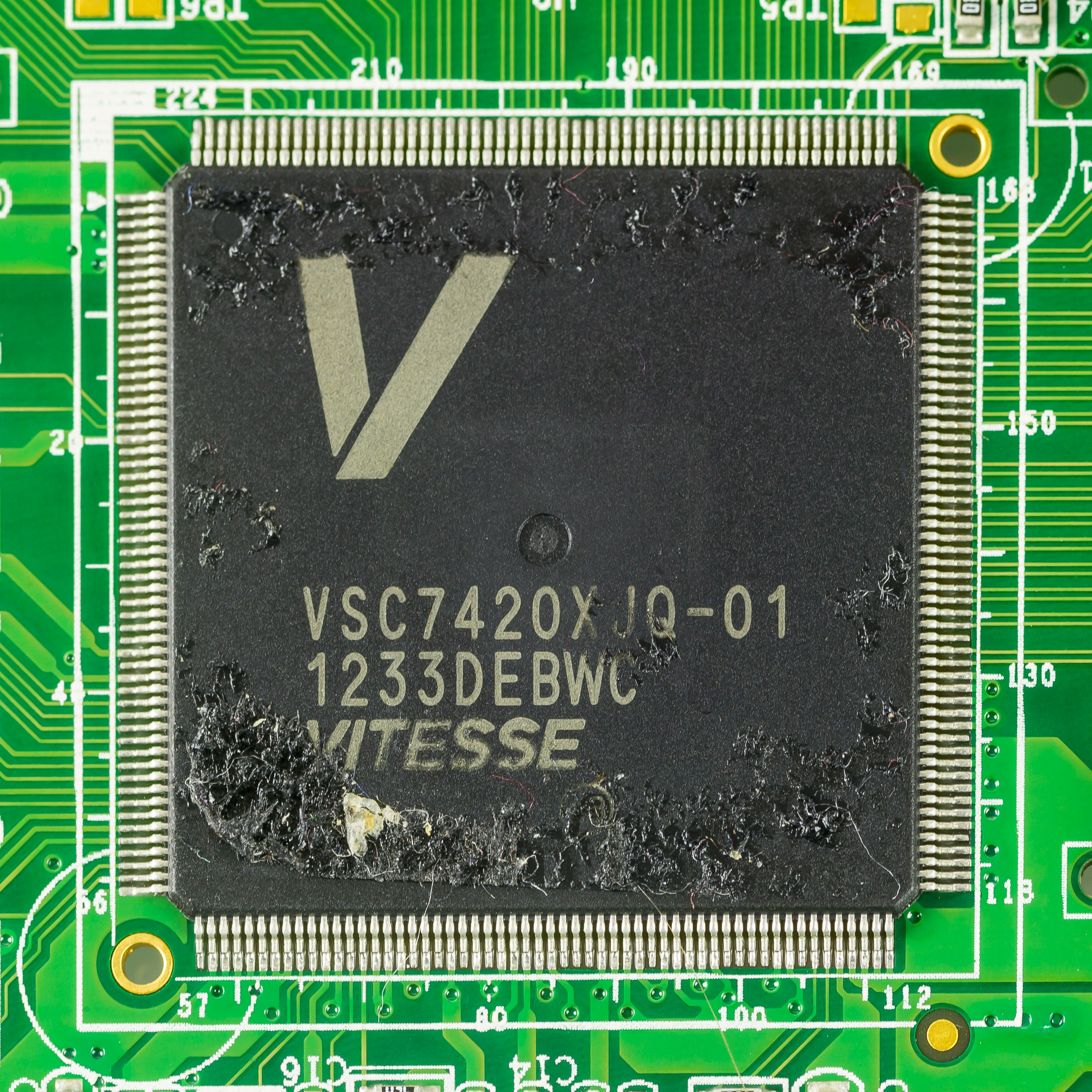
VSC7420XJQ-01 - 10-Port Layer-2 Gigabit Ethernet Switch

Vitesse was one of the early developers of gallium arsenide (GaAs) based integrated circuits. It now offers a line of Ethernet switching products consisting of Carrier Ethernet switch engines for customer-premises equipment, access network equipment, wireless base stations, mobile access equipment, fiber and microwave wireless backhaul equipment, and metro networking equipment; and Ethernet switches that enable desktop, workgroup, and LAN infrastructure. The company also provides Ethernet media access controllers that offer addressing and channel control mechanisms and are used in enterprise class modular Ethernet switch platforms, as well as in Ethernet-over-SONET/SDH and Ethernet-over-OTN systems used in access, metro, and long-haul carrier networking systems; Ethernet transceivers, including single, quad, and octal devices that allow the transmission of 10/100/1000 BASE-T data over category 5 copper cable and fiber optic cabling for use in personal computers, home electronics, and LAN applications; and Ethernet transceivers with packet timing and synchronization capabilities. In addition, it provides a line of connectivity products, which comprise mixed-signal physical media devices, physical layer devices, crosspoint switches, and signal integrity devices that are used for the connection of systems via optical fiber, copper cable, or backplanes. Further, Vitesse offers a range of transport processing products, such as framers, mappers, and switches, which support data rates up to 10 Gbit/s for SONET/SDH, EoS, and OTN applications. It markets and sells its products directly to OEMs and original design manufacturers, as well as through third-party electronic component distributors and manufacturing service providers.

== Mini-Supercomputer ==
Vitesse developed a minisupercomputer intended for the scientific market and employing the company's GaAs chips. The company closed that division in 1987 with the first model as demonstration version. Reportedly management was unable to raise sufficient funds and thought bringing the product to market would take too long.

== Securities fraud ==
In 2007 the company paid US$10.2 million to settle a class action lawsuit alleging securities fraud though options backdating, saying that the company failed to disclose and misrepresented some adverse facts. Subsequently, in 2010, two of its former executives, Lou Tomasetta and the former executive vice president Eugene Hovanec were charged with securities fraud related to the backdating. In December 2010, Vitesse finalized a settlement with the United States Securities and Exchange Commission (SEC), over the SEC's investigations into the firm's historical stock options practices and accounting. Vitesse agreed to pay $3.0M to the SEC, which concluded the SEC's investigation of Vitesse.

== Turnaround ==
In June 2014, the Camarillo-based chip company diluted, announcing a $23.2M stock offering, a planned sale of 7.5 million shares at $3.35 each, to be used for working capital and general corporate purposes.

In June 2013, Vitesse previously diluted, closing an $18.7 million offering at a price-per-share, $2.15, with gross proceeds approximately $40.2M. The company diluted the year before, netting $17.1M from an offering in December 2012.

In the June 2014 dilution, Vitesse's largest shareholder, Raging Capital Management LLC, purchased an additional 1.6 million shares. This raised Raging Capital's total position to 14.3 million shares, or approximately 25% of Vitesse's outstanding shares.
