= USS Hatteras (ID-2142) =

Cargo ship of the United States Navy

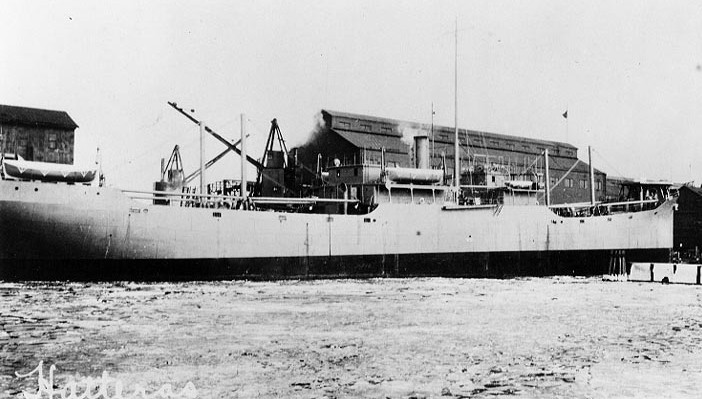
- Probably photographed in 1917 while still in the hands of her builders, Bethlehem Shipbuilding, Sparrows Point, Maryland.

History

United States
- Name: USS Hatteras
- Namesake: An inlet on the coast of North Carolina.
- Owner: Cunard Line
- Builder: Bethlehem Shipping Corp. of Sparrows Point, Maryland
- Launched: 20 November 1917
- Commissioned: 23 October 1917 at Baltimore, Maryland
- Decommissioned: 8 April 1919 at New York City
- Fate: Returned to the United States Shipping Board 8 April 1919, retained until she was abandoned in 1938

General characteristics
- Type: freighter
- Displacement: 10,505 tons
- Length: 377 ft (115 m)
- Beam: 52 ft (16 m)
- Draft: 23 ft 10 in (7.26 m)
- Propulsion: steam engine
- Speed: 10 knots (19 km/h; 12 mph)

The second USS Hatteras was a Cunard Line freighter acquired by the U.S. Navy during World War I and was used to transport men and war materials to France. Post-war she was returned to the U.S. Shipping Board as redundant to needs.

== Service history ==
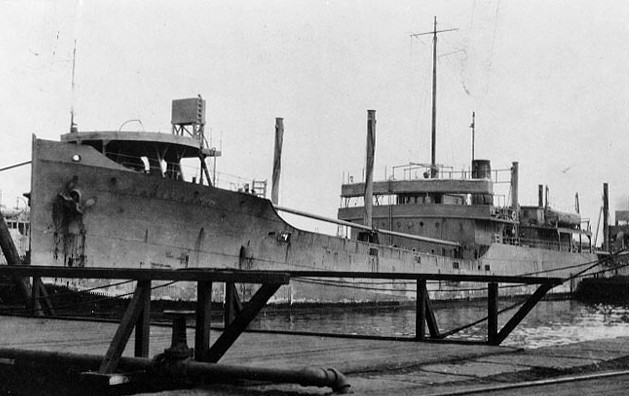
Probably photographed in 1919, after World War I Navy service as USS Hatteras (ID # 2142). The ship appears to be loaded, with worn paintwork and an empty gun platform forward

The second U.S. Navy ship to be named Hatteras was built in 1917 for the Cunard Line by the Bethlehem Shipbuilding Corporation of Sparrows Point, Maryland. Acquired by the U.S. Navy for the war effort, she was commissioned on 23 October 1917. After loading cargo, mainly iron, in Maryland, Hatteras joined a convoy at Norfolk, Virginia, and sailed for France on 26 January 1918. On 4 February, the convoy ran into a severe North Atlantic Ocean storm, and Hatteras' steering gear broke down completely. The disabled ship headed back to Boston, Massachusetts, using a jury-rigged steering system, arriving 11 days later.

On 6 March, she sailed again for France via Halifax, Nova Scotia, but 11 days later ran into another severe storm. Once again, broken steering gear forced her to turn back to Boston. On 9 April, Hatteras sailed for France for the third time, this time through relatively calm seas, and arrived in Nantes on the 30th. After successfully discharging cargo, she returned to Baltimore on 23 May. Thereafter, she made four more Atlantic crossings, one to Nantes and three to Bordeaux, finally returning to New York City on 19 March 1919.

Hatteras decommissioned there on 8 April 1919 and was returned to the United States Shipping Board (USSB), which retained her until she was abandoned at Shanghai in 1938. Taken into private ownership and renamed Hatterlock, she was subsequently seized by Japan in 1941 and operated by Miyachi Kisen KK of Kobe as Renzan Maru. It was under this name that she was torpedoed and sunk on 1 January 1943 by USS Porpoise (SS-172) off Yap.
