= Artel Electronics =

Consumer electronics manufacturer in Central Asia

Artel Electronics Group
- Industry: Consumer electronics
- Headquarters: Tashkent, Uzbekistan
- Area served: Russia & CIS Worldwide (2025)
- Website: Official website

Artel Electronics is a company from Uzbekistan that manufactures consumer electronics. The company's headquarters are in Tashkent, Uzbekistan.

== History ==
In 2011, the company established its first factory in Tashkent, producing gas stoves. The company released its first smartphone in 2012.

In 2021, the company was rated as "B" for its long-term issuer default rating, and was also rated "B" the following year.
