= TL 9000 =

TL 9000 is a quality management system standard designed by the QuEST Forum in 1998. It was created to focus on supply chain directives throughout the international telecommunications industry, including the USA.

== Overview ==
As with IATF 16949 for the automotive industry and AS9100 for the aerospace industry, TL 9000 specializes the generic ISO 9001 standard to meet the needs of one industrial sector, which for TL 9000 is the information and communications technology (ICT) sector—extending from service providers through ICT equipment manufacturers through the suppliers and contractors and subcontractors that provide electronic components, software components and services to those ICT equipment manufacturers.

TL 9000 is defined by two documents:

- TL 9000 Requirements Handbook, whose current release 6.3 optionally includes the full text of ISO 9001:2015
- TL 9000 Measurements Handbook, whose most recent release was 5.7

== Reports ==
Reports on defect tracking and other measurements at various levels of granularity are accumulated by TL 9000 compliant facilities of certified organizations by the University of Texas at Dallas, which is the official TL 9000 administrator. These reports are provided at no additional charge to TL 9000 member companies and for an additional fee to TL 9000 Liaison members and non-members. Generally, these measurement data permit a service provider to compare the defect rates among various equipment manufacturers and against each other.

== See also ==
- Technical file
