= Oscilloquartz =

Swiss timekeeping products manufacturer

Oscilloquartz SA
- Company type: Limited company
- Founded: 1949
- Headquarters: Saint-Blaise, Switzerland
- Products: Precision timekeeping electronics
- Parent: ADVA (2014-2021); Adtran (2021-current)
- Website: www.oscilloquartz.com

Oscilloquartz SA is a manufacturer precision timekeeping electronics including atomic clocks, Precision Time Protocol hardware and GNSS clocks. Oscilloquartz's portfolio also includes its Ensemble synchronization monitoring and management software. Oscilloquartz timing and synchronization products are designed for applications in utilities, defense, finance, IoT, broadcasting and mobile networks, including 5G networks. Its company headquarters is in Saint-Blaise, Switzerland. It has been a subsidiary of Adtran since 2021.

== Products ==
Optical cesium atomic clocks - Oscilloquartz has developed optical cesium atomic clocks that are more stable and accurate than magnetic cesium-based solutions and exceed the current ITU-T G.811.1 enhanced primary reference clock (ePRC) specification. The current highest-end clocks in this range combine with core grandmaster devices to provide holdover accuracy of 100 nanoseconds for 100 days.

"Multi-source grandmaster clocks with STL capability" - In 2024, Adtran Oscilloquartz released its OSA 5405-S grandmaster solution. Alongside a GNSS receiver and an integrated cesium clock, the device features a satellite time and location (STL) module that can access low-Earth orbit (LEO) satellite signals for increased positioning navigation and timing (PNT) resiliency. The company also offers a pluggable module with STL capabilities for augmenting third-party equipment.

"Time Scale System" - The Oscilloquartz Time Scale System is a fully integrated, customizable timekeeping solution that ensures UTC realization and adheres to stringent international standards.

== History ==
Logo as of 2016, when it was part of ADVA Optical Networking
Logo as of 2003, when it was part of the Swatch Group
- Oscilloquartz began its operations as a department of Ebauches SA in 1949, during the pioneering days of time and frequency measurement.
- In 1950, Oscilloquartz equipped the Observatory of Neuchâtel where the first quartz clocks were installed. Further quartz clocks were delivered to the Observatory of Paris in 1955.
- In 1958, Oscilloquartz began their activity in atomic frequency standards. An ammoniac maser designed by the LSRH, was built and shown at the Universal Exhibition of Brussels. Subsequently, a hydrogen maser was developed and, until 1988, nine units were manufactured and delivered to several observatories and institutes worldwide.
- In 1962, it developed of a complete redundant frequency generating system for Swisscom (formerly named Swiss PTT) of which more than 50 were delivered in the 1960s and 1970s.
- In 1964, it focussed on the field of caesium frequency standards and in 1966 delivered its first commercial atomic clock to the ESRO, the predecessor of the European Space Agency (ESA).
- In 1967, The Swiss atomic clock "OSCILLATOM" was shown at Expo 67, Montreal. During that same year, transport and transfer of precise time was carried out in the United States, Canada, Far East and South America.
- In 1971, Oscilloquartz SA was officially registered as a corporation.
- In 1978, Swisscom (formerly Swiss PTT) commissioned Oscilloquartz to supply a new generation of plesiochronous and synchronous equipment for hierarchy levels I and II of their digital communications network. Over thirty similar synchronization systems were subsequently installed worldwide.
- In 1988, In a joint venture with SERCEL, France, Oscilloquartz developed the new European Digital Caesium Standard, EUDICS, with fully digital control loops and remote capabilities via RS-232 interface.
- In 2014, ADVA Optical Networking acquired Oscilloquartz SA from the Swatch Group.
