= Glauert =

Glauert may refer to:

People:

- Hermann Glauert, FRS (1892–1934), British aerodynamicist, Principal Scientific Officer of the Royal Aircraft Establishment, Farnborough until 1934, husband of Muriel below.
- Ludwig Glauert (1879–1963), British-born Australian paleontologist, herpetologist and museum curator
- Muriel Glauert (1892–1949) British mathematician specialising in aerodynamics, wife of Hermann above.

Animals:

- Glauert's anglerfish (Allenichthys glauerti), an anglerfish that is unique to its genus
- Glauert's froglet (Crinia glauerti), a species of frog in the family Myobatrachidae

Technology:

- Prandtl–Glauert transformation, approximation function which allows to compare aerodynamical processes occurring at different Mach numbers
- Prandtl–Glauert singularity, drop in air pressure around an aircraft at transonic speeds causing a visible condensation cloud
