= William Shone =

William Shone may refer to:

- William Shone (British Army officer) (1850–1938), British Army officer
- William Shone (footballer) (1857–?), Welsh international footballer

== See also ==
- Shone (surname)
