= Shone (surname) =

Shone is a surname. Notable people with the surname include:

- Danny Shone (born 1899), English footballer
- George Shone (1922–2009), English footballer
- Gwen Shone, married name Gwen Alston (1907–1993), British aerodynamicist
- John D. Shone (fl. 1960s), American physician, eponym of Shone's syndrome
- Lowri Shone (born 1996), English ballerina
- Richard Shone (born 1949), British art historian
- Samuel Shone (1820–1901), Irish Anglican bishop
- John Shone (born 1935), British cleric
- Terence Shone (1894–1965), British diplomat
- Thomas Shone (1784–1868), British settler in South Africa
- Tom Shone, American film critic and writer
- Tristan Shone of Author & Punisher, musician
- William Shone (British Army officer) (1850–1938), British general
- William Shone (footballer) (born 1857), Welsh footballer
