= Shone =

Shone may refer to:

- "Shone" (song), a 2009 song by Flo Rida
- Shone, Ethiopia, a town in Badawacho District
- Shone (surname)

== People with the given name ==
- Shone An (1983–2015), Taiwanese singer, actor and television host

== See also ==
- Shine (disambiguation)
- Shone's syndrome
