= Vapor cone =

Condensation pattern in transonic flight

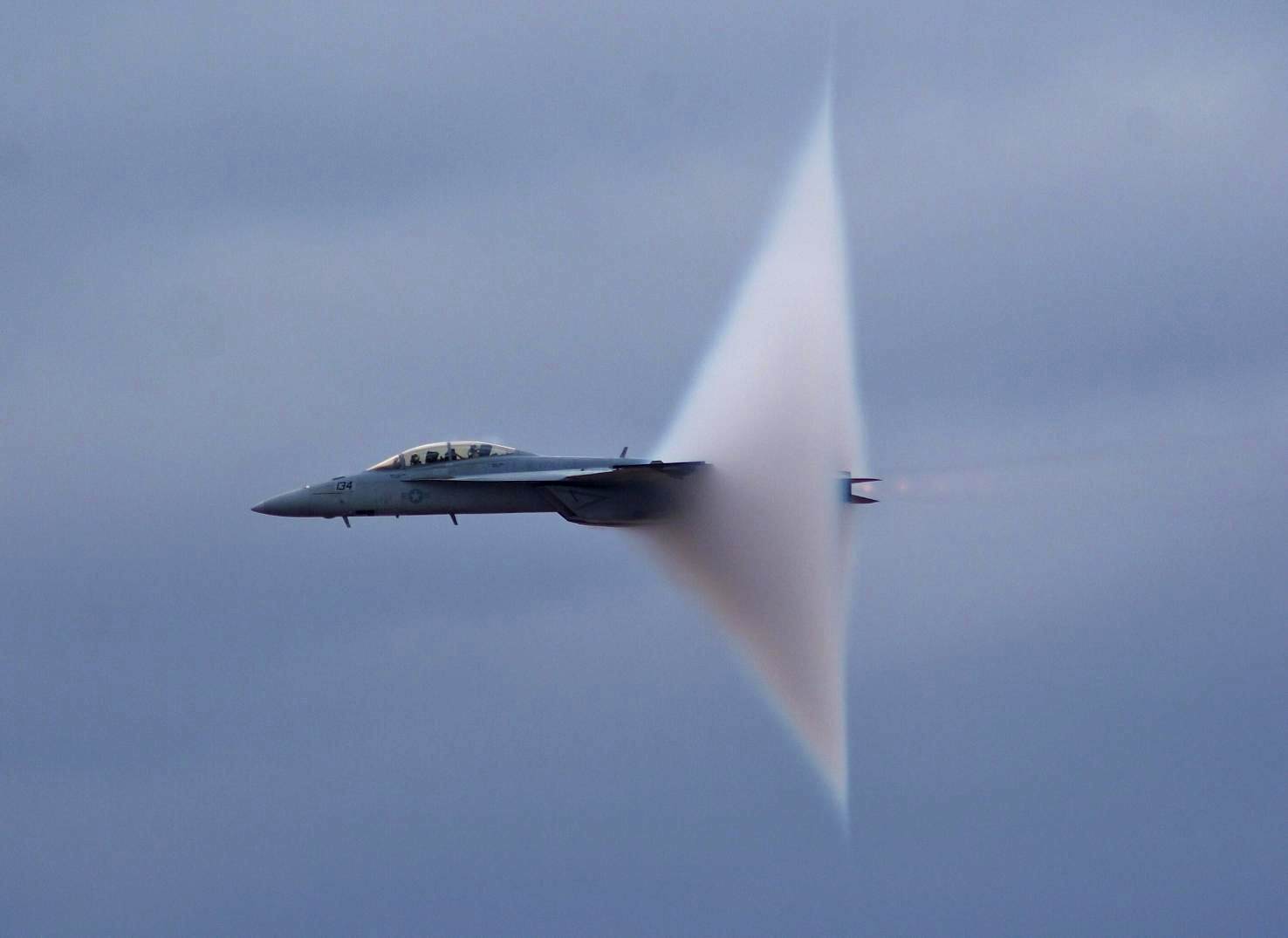
An F/A-18F during transonic flight

A vapor cone (also known as a shock collar, or shock egg) is a visible cloud of condensed water that can sometimes form around an object moving at high speed through moist air, such as an aircraft flying at transonic speeds. When the localized air pressure around the object drops, so does the air temperature. If the temperature drops below the saturation temperature, a cloud forms.

In the case of aircraft, the cloud is caused by expansion fans decreasing the air pressure (static pressure), density, and temperature below the dew point. Then pressure, density, and temperature suddenly increase across the stern shock wave associated with a return to subsonic flow behind the aircraft. Since the local Mach number is not uniform over the aircraft, parts of the aircraft may experience supersonic flow while others "see" subsonic air — a flight regime called transonic flight.

In addition to making the shock waves themselves visible, water condensation can also occur in the trough between two crests of the shock waves produced by the passing of the object. However, this effect does not necessarily coincide with the acceleration of an aircraft through the speed of sound or Mach 1.

== Examples ==
These condensation clouds can often be seen appearing around space-bound rockets as they accelerate through the atmosphere. For example, they were frequently seen during Space Shuttle launches, about 25 to 33 seconds after launch, when the vehicle was traveling at transonic speeds. Similar effects were also visible in archival footage of some nuclear tests.

== Gallery ==
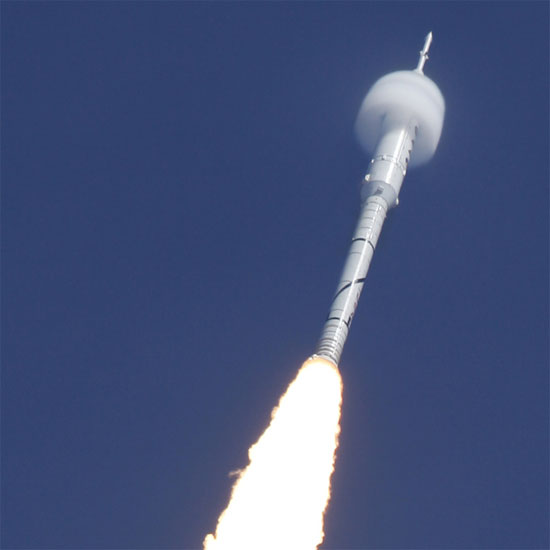
Ares I-X test rocket during launch October 28, 2009

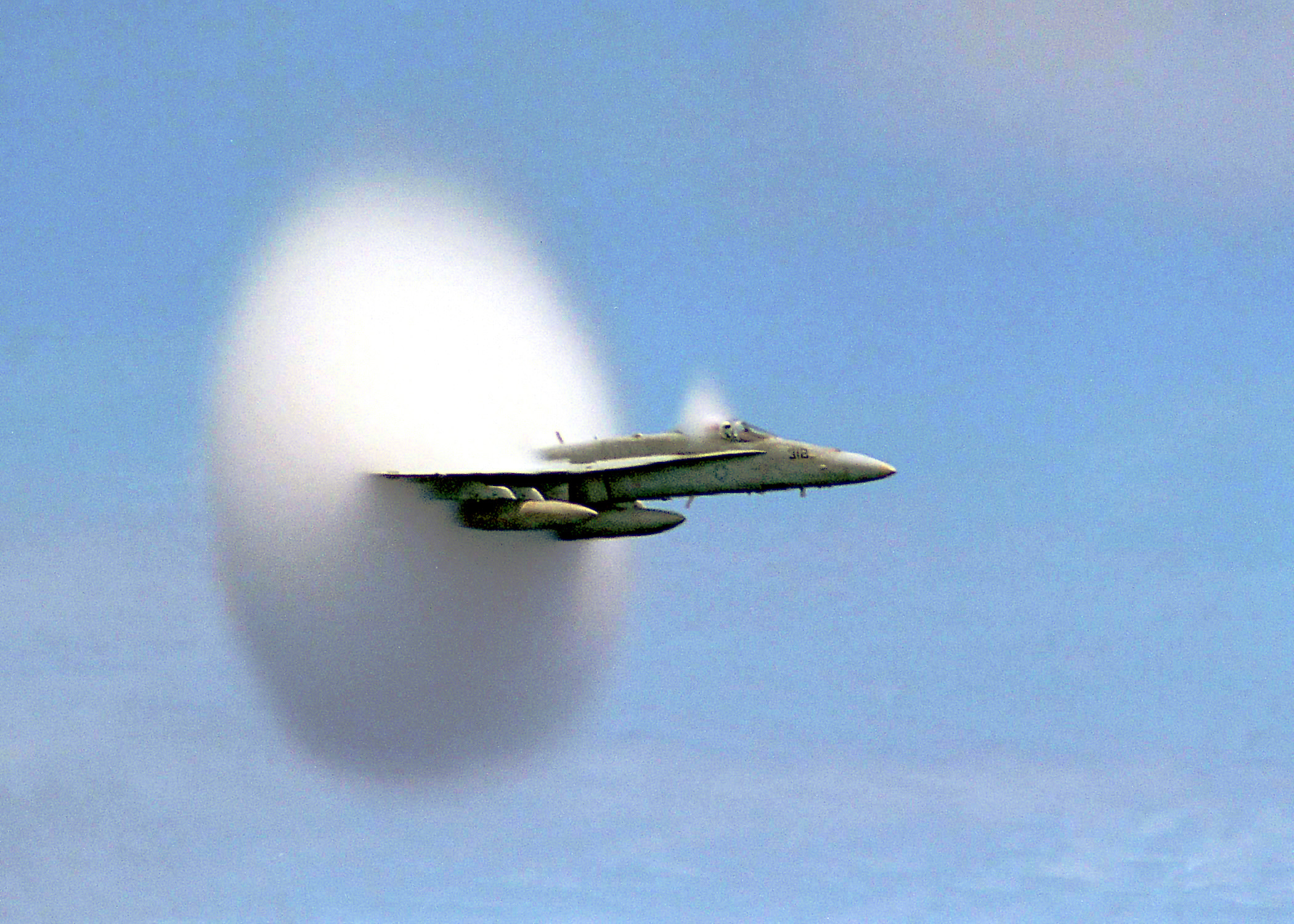
F/A-18C at transonic speed

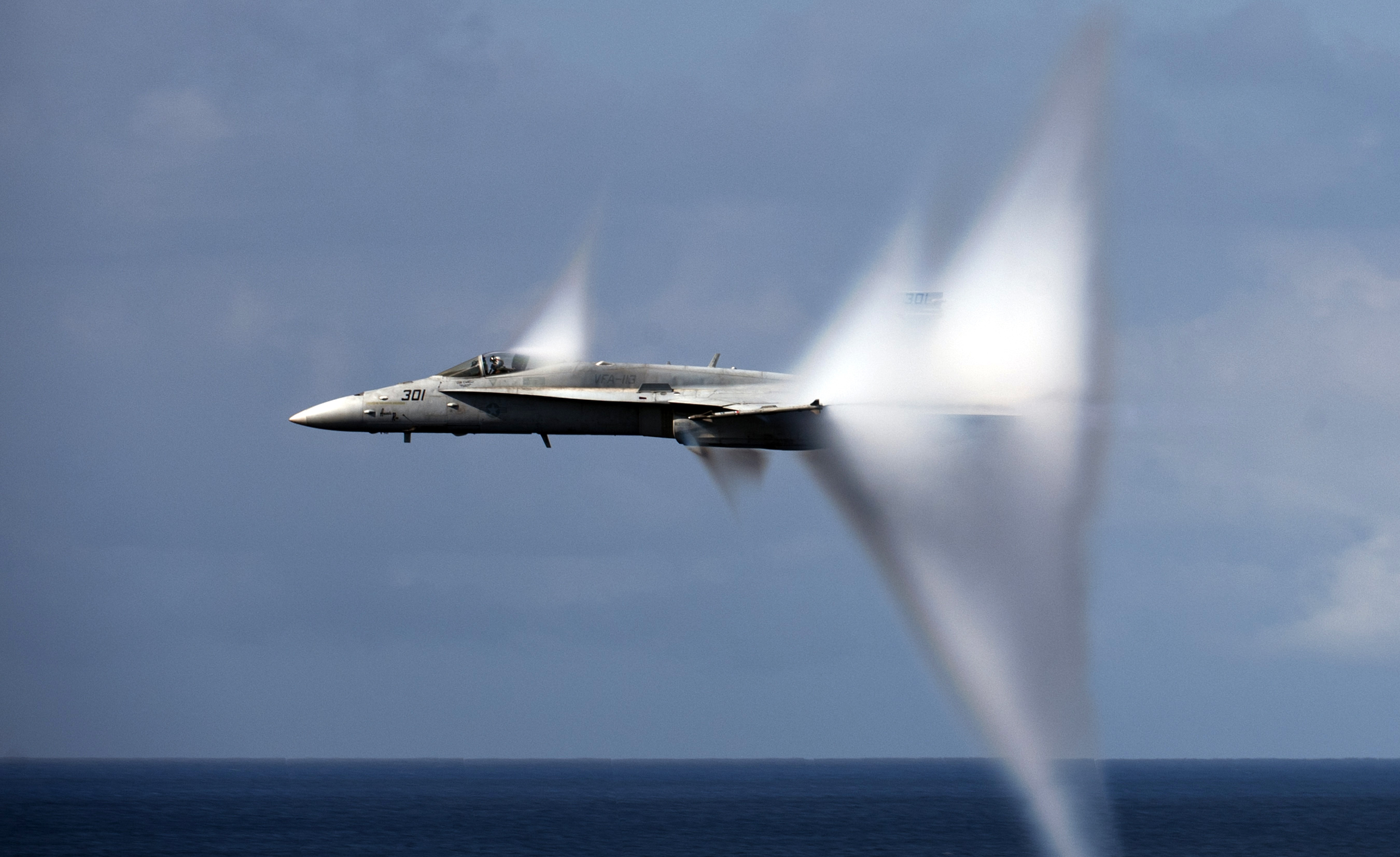
Complex set of condensation cones surrounds an F/A-18C at transonic speed

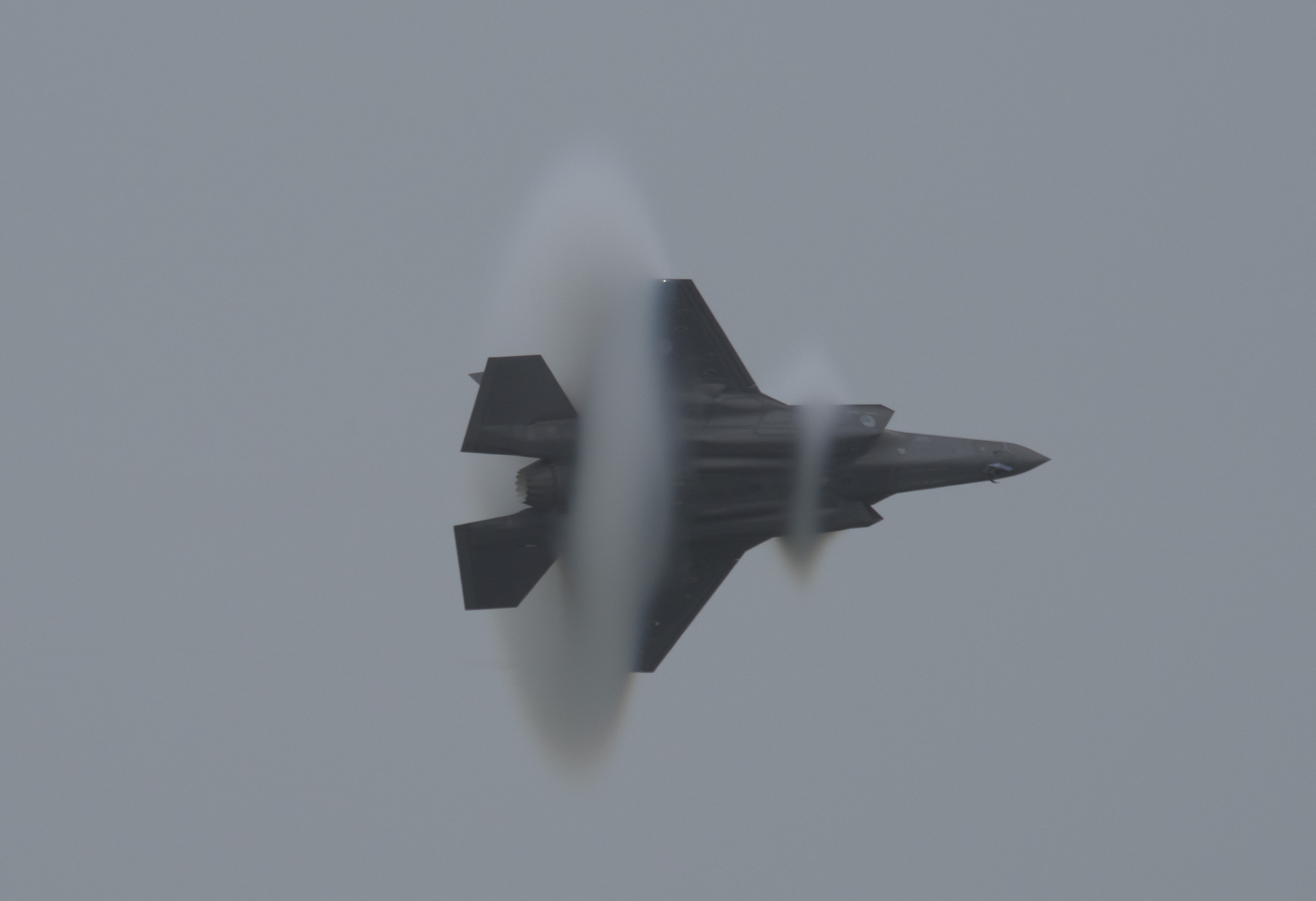
F-35 with a double vapor cone

== See also ==
- Sonic boom
- Sound barrier
- Shock diamond
- Shock wave
- Contrail
- Condensation cloud
- Prandtl–Glauert singularity
- Condensation
