= Nottingham Girls' High School =

Independent selective girls-only day school in Nottingham

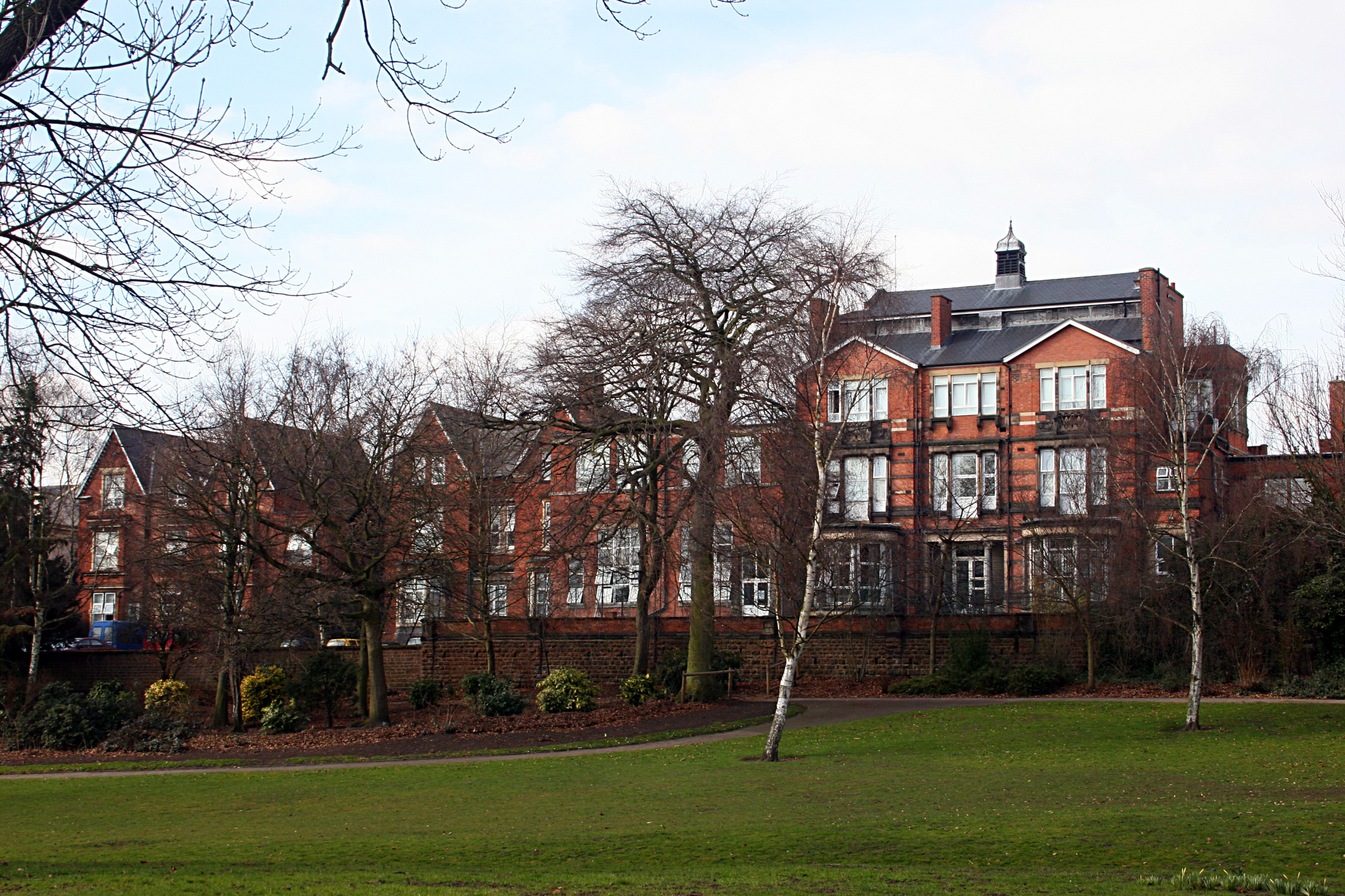

Location
- 9 Arboretum Street; Nottingham, Nottinghamshire, NG1 4JB; England; 52°57′46″N 1°09′22″W

Information
- Type: Private girls-only day school
- Motto: Progressive. Creative. Different.
- Established: 1875; 151 years ago
- Local authority: Nottingham
- Department for Education URN: 122936 Tables
- Chair of Governors: Emma Wilson
- Head teacher: Julie Keller
- Gender: Girls
- Age: 3 to 19
- Houses: Bolton; Hastings; Luxton; Skeel
- Colours: Sky Blue, Navy Blue
- Website: https://nottinghamgirlshigh.gdst.net/

Nottingham Girls' High School is a private day school for girls aged 3–19, located north of Nottingham city centre. Founded in 1875, it is part of the Girls' Day School Trust.

It should not be confused with Nottingham Girls Academy, which is based in Aspley, Nottingham.

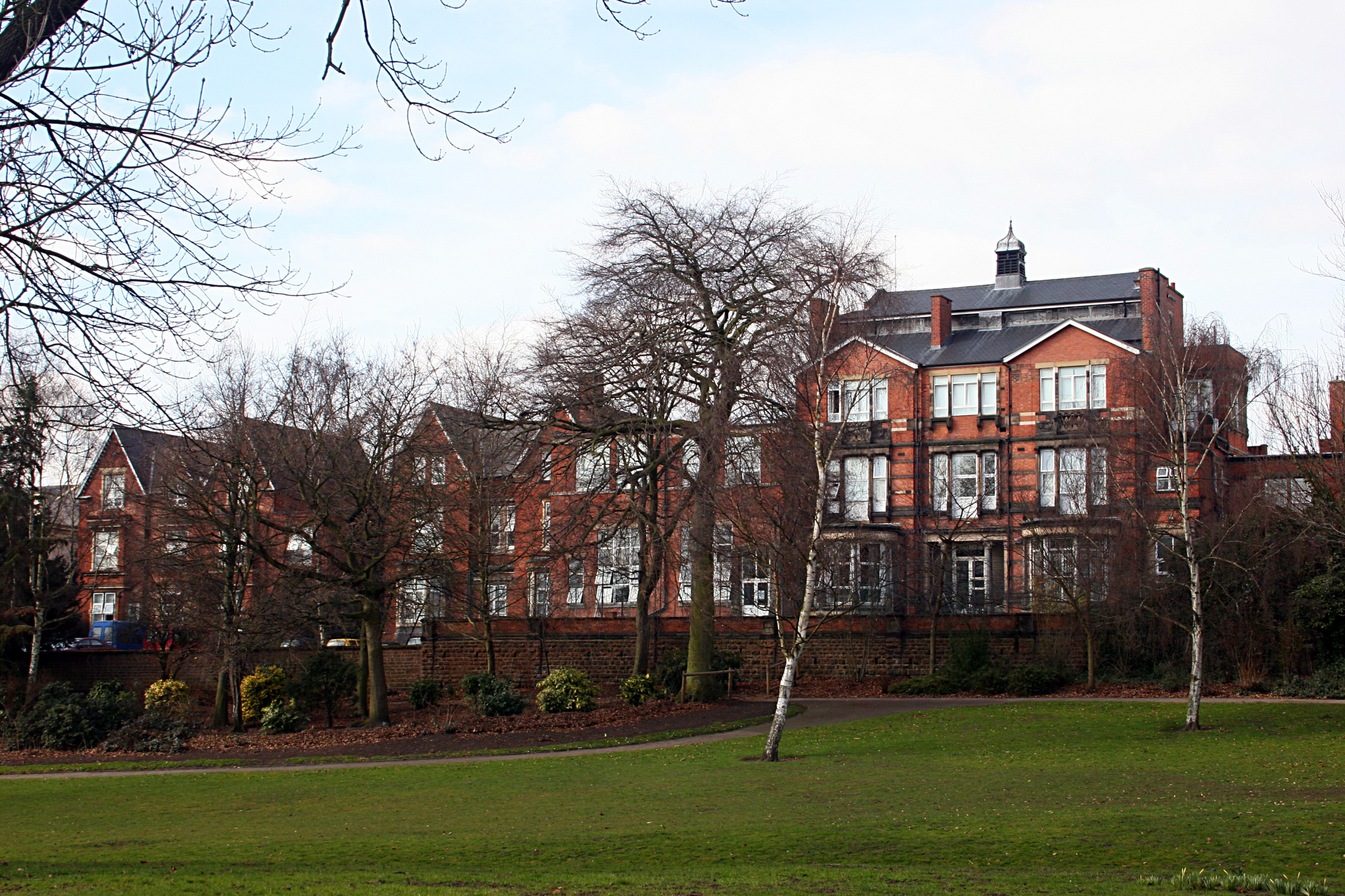
Nottingham Girls' High School from the Arboretum.

== History ==
Before the 1870s, education for girls in Nottingham was fixed by social class, with limited opportunities for working-class girls to receive any post-primary schooling. Much of the development in girls' education was due to the work of feminist reformers.

Nottingham Girls' High School was founded on 14 September 1875 by the Girls' Public Day School Company (now the Girls' Day School Trust). The school initially opened on Oxford Street with 34 pupils before relocation to Arboretum Street, where enrolment had grown to 146.

During the Second World War, the school temporarily relocated to Ramsdale Park and Daybrook, with its original buildings requisitioned by the South Notts Hussars. It returned to Arboretum Street in 1944–1945, and by its 80th anniversary in 1955 the school had expanded to 800 pupils.

The latter half of the 20th century saw significant building and curricular development. The Milford Building was opened in 1973, followed by the Edinburgh Library in 1978. A house system was introduced in 1995, and the Bowering Sports Hall opened in 1998. A new Sixth Form Centre was completed in 2009, and in 2016 the former dining hall was replaced by the Squire Performing Arts Centre, named for alumna Dame Rosemary Squire.

In 2020 the school opened a nursery, and in 2023 the refurbished 1875 Sports Centre was inaugurated by Lydia Greenway OBE. Since its founding, Nottingham Girls' High School has been led by thirteen headmistresses and one acting headteacher; the current Head is Julie Keller.

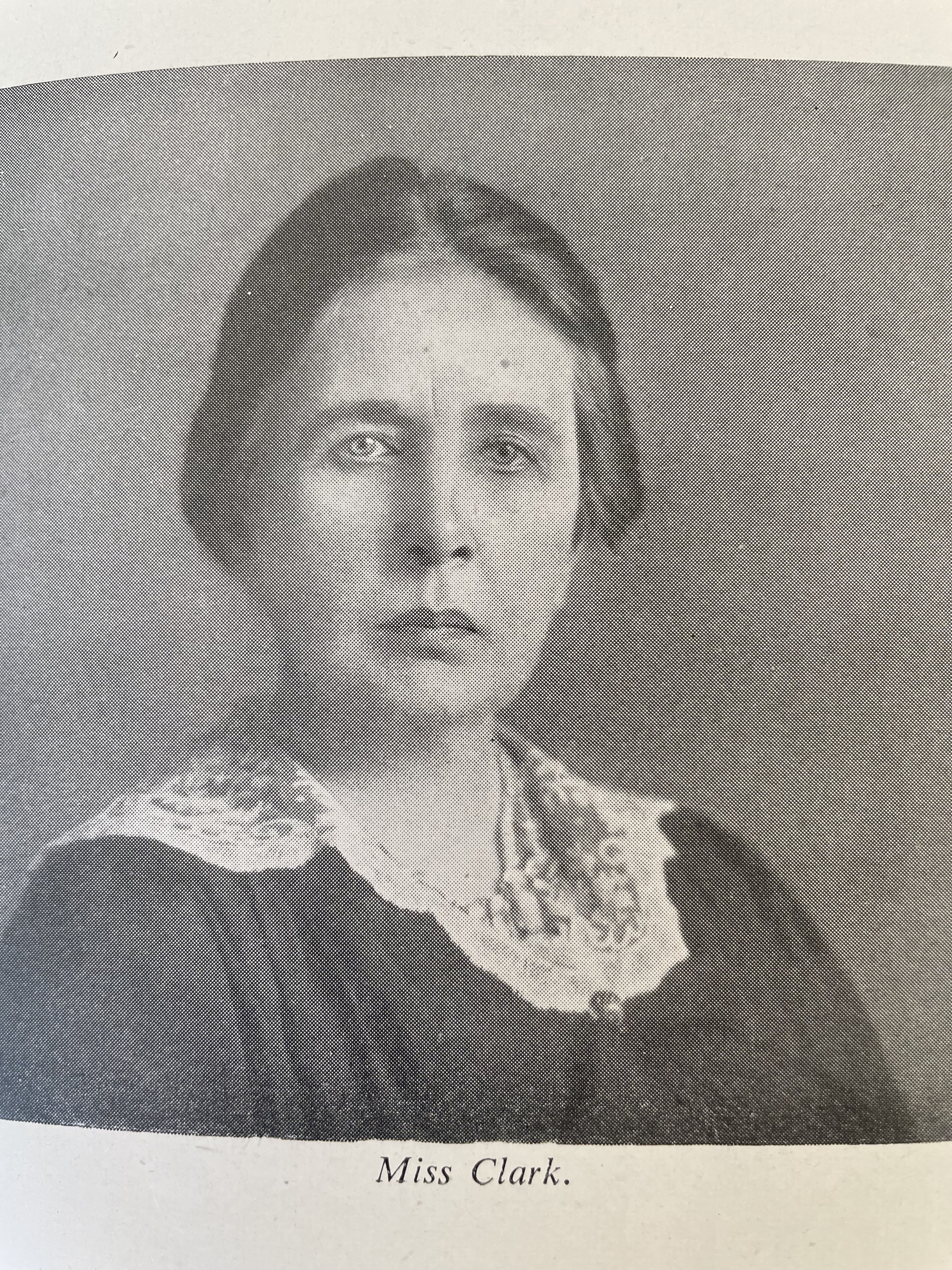
Miss Clark Headmistress NGHS (1898–1921). Photograph

Miss Cecily Cerise Clark served as the school's fifth headmistress from 1898 to 1921. A former assistant mistress at St. Leonards School, she oversaw significant early development at Nottingham Girls’ High School, including the introduction of the first school play (1901), the founding of the NGHS Old Girls’ Association charity society (1908), and the establishment of various academic and extracurricular societies. During her tenure, pupil numbers rose to 393, the school received strong praise in its first formal inspection, and new clubs such as the tennis and hockey association, the Shakespeare Circle, and the revived Debating Society were formed. Despite wartime disruptions, the period also saw the introduction of scholarships and fundraising initiatives, including the Fussell Leaving Scholarship in 1920.

Miss Winifred Dorothea Philipps became headmistress in September 1921, having joined Nottingham Girls’ High School in 1900 as a history teacher and later serving as second mistress under Miss Clark. During her tenure, pupil numbers rose from 393 to over 450, and significant reforms were introduced, including the 1922 direct grant scheme, which provided free places for state-educated girls, and the adoption of a school uniform to reduce class distinctions. Educated at Bath High School and Newnham College, Cambridge, Philipps spent her entire 35-year career at the school until retiring in 1935; she was later honoured with the Philipps History Prize. She died in 1952 at the age of 79. According to Prof. H. H. Swinnerton, chairman of the governors, she was distinguished by her high ideals, quiet dignity, and devoted leadership, under which the school “grew and prospered”.

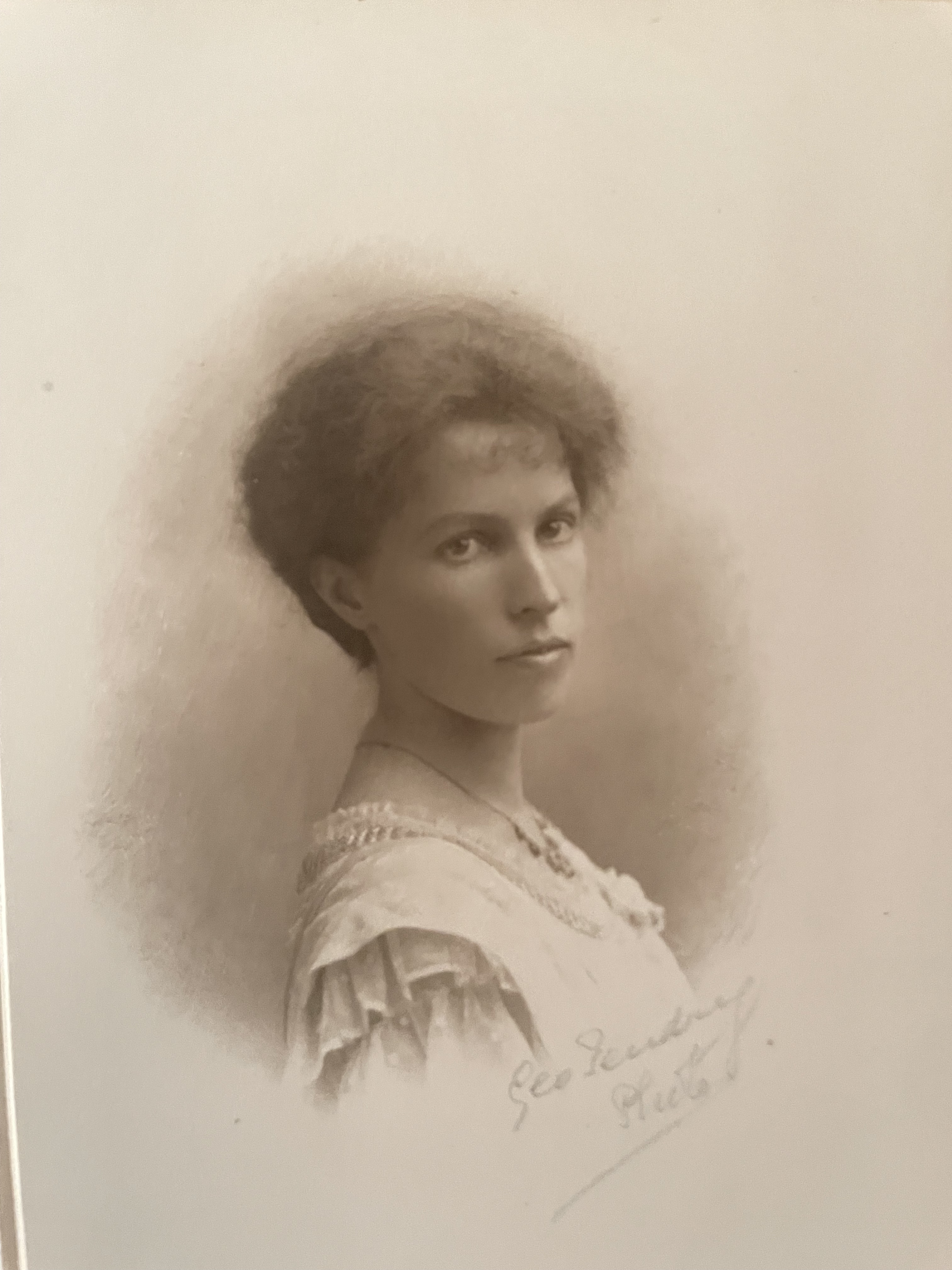
Miss Philipps, Headmistress (1921–1935) Nottingham Girls High School

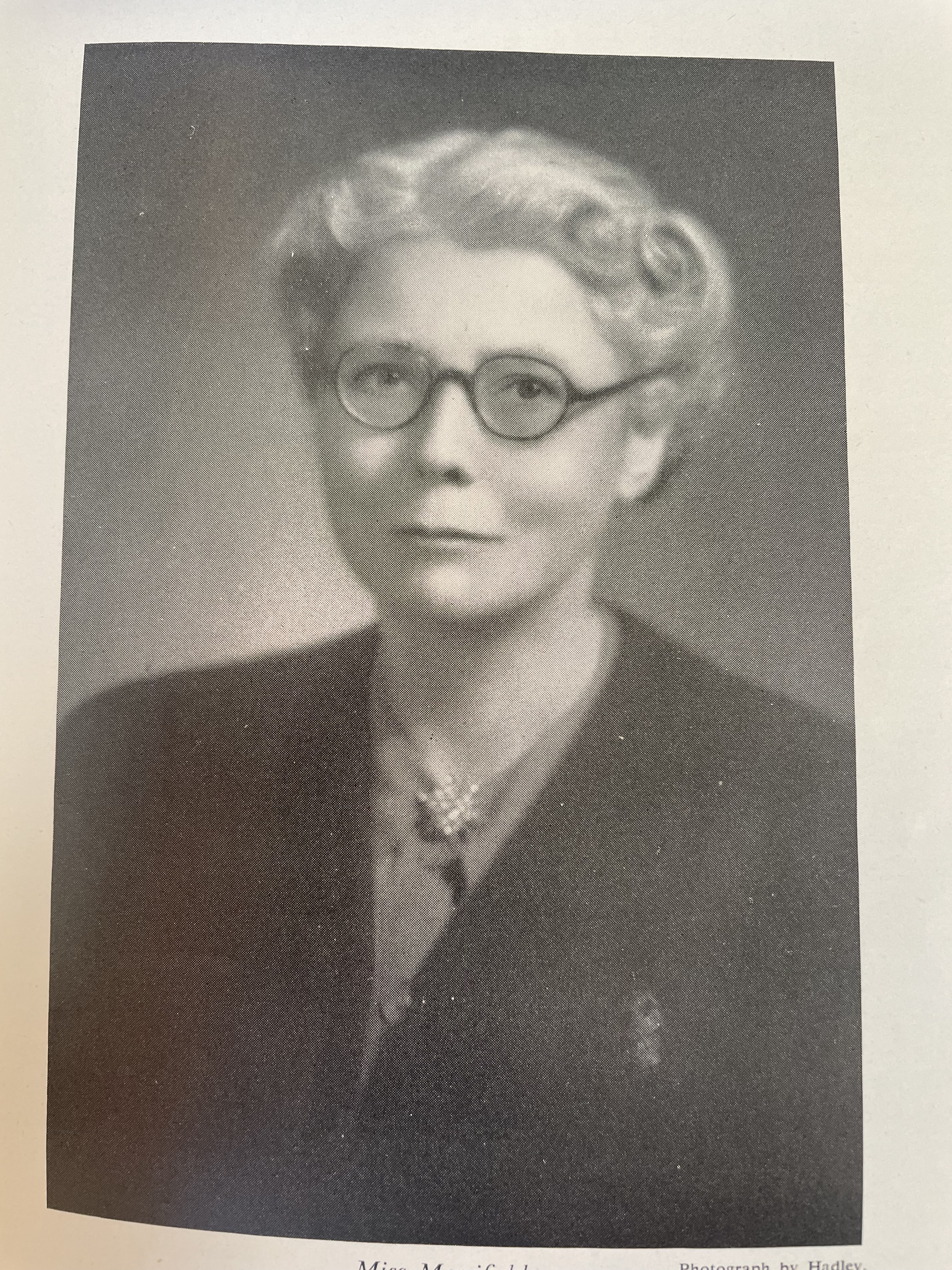
Miss Merrifield Headmistress NGHS

Eileen Mary Merrifield served as headmistress of Nottingham Girls’ High School from 1936 to 1950. Born on 22 July 1899 in Haverfordwest, Wales, she was educated at Derby High School, Dulwich High School, and Somerville College, Oxford, where she read Modern History. Before joining NGHS, she taught at several schools, including Modern School Exeter and Clapham County Secondary School.

During her tenure, the school undertook significant expansion and modernization: new classrooms and laboratories were added, facilities were refurbished, a covered walkway and studio space were built, and the uniform and curriculum were updated to include specialised courses and a pre-nursing program. Pupil numbers rose to over 480 by 1939. The school was evacuated during the Second World War and returned to Arboretum Street in 1944. Merrifield also oversaw the introduction of the first school council, the first parents’ meetings, and elections for Head Girl and Deputy, as well as cultural activities such as staff theatre productions and the revival of the school choir.

In 1950, Merrifield left NGHS to become head of Notting Hill and Ealing High School, a post she held until 1960. She later became a librarian and an Honorary Fellow of St Anne's College, Oxford.

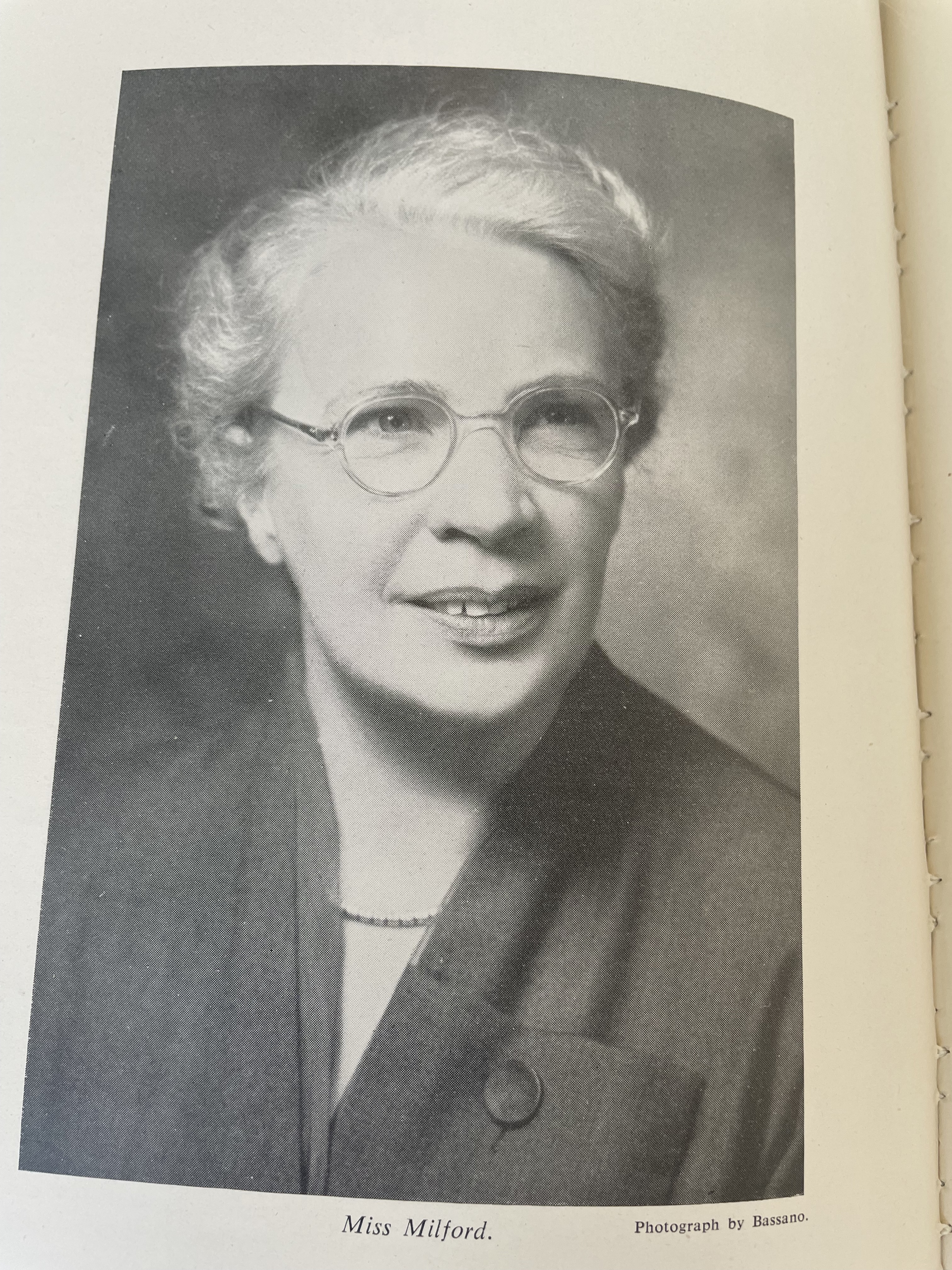
Miss Milford

Frances Mary Milford served as the eighth headmistress of Nottingham Girls’ High School. During her tenure, the school expanded its academic and extracurricular activities, including the first appearance of the school orchestra at prize-giving and increased participation in sports and international trips.[1] Facilities were improved with the restoration of rooms for history and geography and the acquisition of No. 7 Arboretum Street.

Academically, the school saw notable success, with multiple state scholarships awarded between 1952 and 1954, including open scholarships to Girton College. By the mid-1950s, enrolment had risen to 814 pupils. The period also included ceremonial events such as tree planting for the Coronation year.

During Milford's tenure, the school underwent significant expansion and development. Derwent House became the Junior School in 1952, and by 1956 pupil numbers had risen to 842. Colville Street Hall was renamed Swinnerton Hall in 1958, the first school lunch was served, and additional properties, including 3, 25, and 27 Arboretum Street, as well as Upnah House, were acquired through the early 1960s. The period also saw the addition of new laboratories, the introduction of the school's first careers room, and several overseas trips, including a 1962 visit to Rome.

The Old Girls’ Association grew, marking its tenth meeting in 1964. By 1965, enrolment had reached 914 pupils, including 170 in the sixth form, and the school celebrated its 90th anniversary with a service at All Saints Church. The Milford Building, later named in her honour, was formally opened on 18 May 1973 by the Duchess of Gloucester.

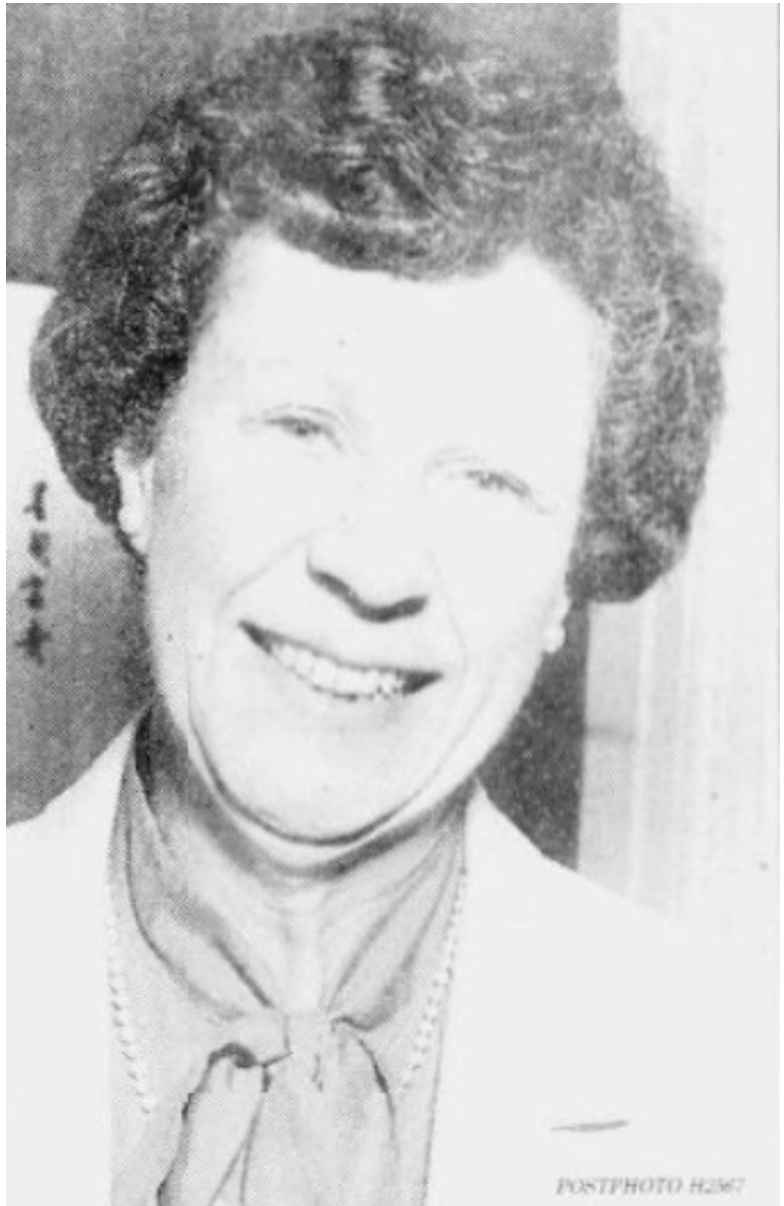
Letty Louise Lewenz

Letty Louise Lewenz (1924–2011) was headmistress of Nottingham Girls’ High School from 1967 and had also been Secretary of the Nottingham Branch of the Women's Freedom League. Her father was Walter Lewenz, whose cousin was Rose Fyleman, the author of many fairy stories and poems, including There are fairies at the bottom of our garden. On the 10th November 1931 she joined Nottingham High School for Girls, firstly with Miss Winifred Philipps as Headmistress and then Miss Eileen Merrifield. She left the school on 28 July 1937 in order to attend Malvern Ladies College, where the headmistress was Miss Iris Brooks. On her appointment the Nottingham Guardian Journal reported her “as a vivacious brunette, friendly and gay with a ready smile which should endear her to the girls". She is remembered as being quite strict, very professional and always wearing her gown, and her dogs always accompanied her to school. During her time the school numbers increased to 970, being the second largest school in the Trust and the largest Trust school outside London.

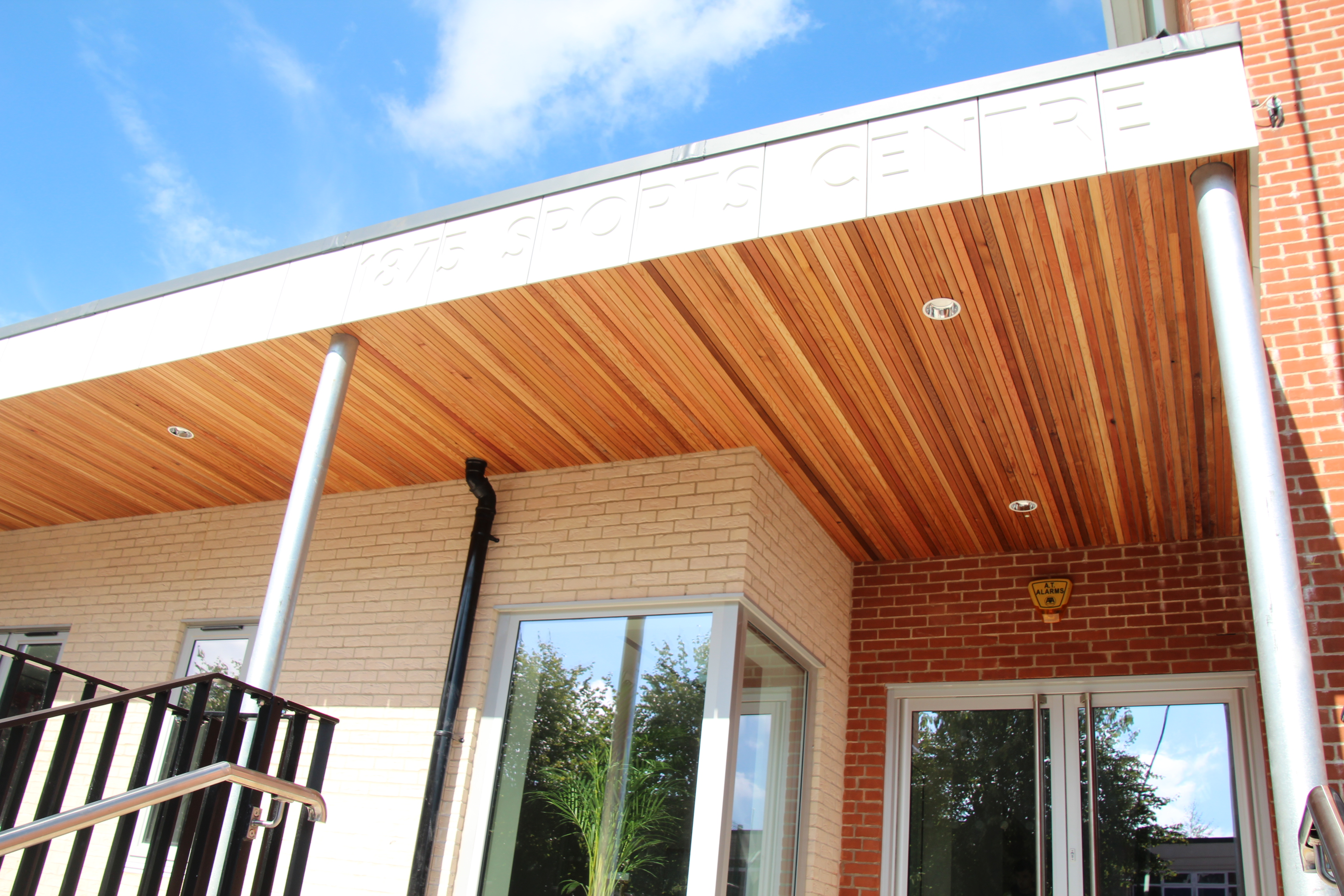
1875 Sports Centre

== Academic structure ==
In the 2019–2020 academic year, the school had 738 student, including 151 in the sixth form studying for A Level. The sixth form is led by a Head of Sixth Form. The Junior School, which has its own head, typically enrols around 280 girls.

== Notable alumnae ==
- Julia Bell (1879–1979), geneticist
- Gina Birch (living), bass player with The Raincoats
- Helen Cooper (born 1947), literary scholar
- Helen Cresswell (1934–2005), children's author
- Janice Elliott (1931–1995), novelist, journalist and children's writer
- Muriel Glauert (1892–1949) mathematician who made significant contributions to early advances in aerodynamics.
- Helen Karagounis (born 1981), née Thieme, 2004 Olympic relay runner
- Sudha Kheterpal (living), percussionist
- Clare Hammond (born 1985), concert pianist
- Julie Myerson (born 1960), author and writer for the Financial Times
- Stella Rimington (1935–2025), Director-General of MI5
- Indhu Rubasingham (living), theatre director
- June Spencer (1919–2024), actress (The Archers)
- Rosemary Squire (born 1956), theatre owner and entrepreneur
- Janet Whitaker, Baroness Whitaker (born 1936), Labour Party politician and Life Peer
- Molly Whittington-Egan (1924–2016), writer
