= Hermann Glauert =

British aerodynamicist (1892-1934)

Hermann Glauert, FRS (4 October 1892 – 6 August 1934) was a British aerodynamicist and Principal Scientific Officer of the Royal Aircraft Establishment, Farnborough until his death in 1934.

== Early life and education ==
Glauert was born in Sheffield, Yorkshire; his German-born father Louis Glauert was a cutlery manufacturer. He attended King Edward VII School, Sheffield and Trinity College, Cambridge.

== Career ==
Glauert wrote numerous reports and memoranda dealing with aerofoil and propeller theory. His book, The Elements of Aerofoil and Airscrew Theory was the single most important instrument for spreading airfoil and wing theory around the English speaking world.

Glauert independently developed Prandtl-Glauert method from the then-existing aerodynamic theory and published his results in The Proceedings of the Royal Society in 1928.

In the 1930s, he was the academic supervisor of aerodynamicist and educationalist Gwen Alston.

== Death ==
Glauert died in 1934, aged 41, in an accident in a small park in Fleet Common in Farnborough.

His school said of him "The tragic and incalculable accident which resulted in the death of Hermann Glauert concerned us also, though less intimately. H. Glauert was a distinguished Edwardian of the early days, leaving the School with a mathematical scholarship to Trinity, Cambridge, in 1910. He became a Fellow of the Royal Society, principal scientific officer at the Royal Aircraft Establishment, Farnborough, and no less than an international authority on aeronautical science (cf Prandtl-Glauert singularity). He was killed by a chance fragment of a tree that was being blown up on Aldershot Common."

== Personal life ==
Glauert married fellow RAE Farnborough aerodynamicist Muriel Barker (1892–1949). They had three children: a son, Michael (1924–2004), and twins Audrey (1925-2014) and Richard (1925-2016).

Glauert is buried in the Ship Lane Cemetery, Farnborough. Muriel Glauert died in 1949, and was buried alongside her husband.

== Publications ==
- The Elements of Aerofoil and Airscrew Theory - Cambridge University Press - 1926

== See also ==
- Prandtl-Glauert method
- Royal Aircraft Establishment (RAE)
