= Muriel Glauert =

British mathematician

- Born: 7 May 1892; Nottingham
- Died: 23 December 1949 (aged 57)
- Education: Newnham College
- Occupation: Aeronautical engineering
- Employer: Royal Aircraft Establishment Farnborough

Muriel Glauert (née Barker) (7 May 1892 – 23 December 1949) was a British mathematician who made significant contributions to early advances in aerodynamics.

== Early life and education ==
Muriel Barker was born in Nottingham, the daughter of a textile manufacturer, and attended Nottingham Girls' High School, where she won prizes for her achievements in German, maths and chemistry. She attended Newnham College, Cambridge, from 1912 to 1915 and completed the mathematical tripos, although this was awarded by London University, as Cambridge was yet to award degrees to women.

== Career at the Royal Aircraft Establishment ==
Barker taught in Liverpool before joining the Royal Aircraft Establishment (RAE) in Farnborough in 1918 as a researcher. Her first publication in her early career at Farnborough was on theoretical streamlines for the flow over an aerofoil. In 1919 she went to study at Bryn Mawr for a year and then undertook postgraduate studies in aeronautics at Cambridge. In August 1922 she published her paper 'On the use of very small pitot-tubes for measuring wind velocity' in the Proceedings of the Royal Society. A pitot tube is a slender tube with two holes used to calculate speed through the air or water, used by both ships and aeroplanes. Barker was the first researcher to demonstrate that the difference between the pitot tube's reading and the static pressure is proportional to the flow speed rather than to its square. In the same year she returned to the RAE, and became engaged to, and later married, the aerodynamicist Hermann Glauert, Principal Scientific Officer at the RAE.

== Later career ==
After her husband was killed in an accident in 1934, Barker later became Examiner in Mathematics for the London and Cambridge and Joint Northern Universities. In 1940 she published a final academic paper, which looked at the capture of raindrops by a cylinder and an aerofoil moving at uniform speed, a problem of ongoing concern due to ice formation, for example, on aeroplane wings in flight.

== Personal life ==
Barker was married to Hermann Glauert, who died in 1934. They had three children: Michael, and twins Audrey and Richard. Muriel Glauert died in 1949 and was buried alongside her husband.
