= Prandtl–Glauert transformation =

Mathematical technique in aerodynamics

The Prandtl–Glauert transformation is a mathematical technique which allows solving certain compressible flow problems by incompressible-flow calculation methods. It also allows applying incompressible-flow data to compressible-flow cases.

== Mathematical formulation ==
Plot of the inverse Prandtl–Glauert factor $1/\beta$ as a function of freestream Mach number. Notice the infinite limit at Mach 1.

Inviscid compressible flow over slender bodies is governed by linearized compressible small-disturbance potential equation:

$$\phi_{xx} + \phi_{yy} + \phi_{zz} = M_\infty^2 \phi_{xx} \quad \mbox{(in flow field)}$$

together with the small-disturbance flow-tangency boundary condition.

$$V_\infty n_x + \phi_y n_y + \phi_z n_z = 0 \quad \mbox{(on body surface)}$$

$M_\infty$ is the freestream Mach number, and $n_x, n_y, n_z$ are the surface-normal vector components. The unknown variable is the perturbation potential $\phi(x,y,z)$, and the total velocity is given by its gradient plus the freestream velocity $V_\infty$ which is assumed here to be along $x$.

$$\vec{V} = \nabla \phi + V_\infty \hat{x} = (V_\infty + \phi_x) \hat{x} + \phi_y \hat{y} + \phi_z \hat{z}$$

The above formulation is valid only if the small-disturbance approximation applies,

$$| \nabla \phi | \ll V_\infty$$

and in addition that there is no transonic flow, approximately stated by the requirement that the local Mach number not exceed unity.

$$\left[1 + (\gamma+1) \frac{\phi_x}{V_\infty} \right] M_\infty^2 < 1$$

The Prandtl–Glauert (PG) transformation uses the Prandtl–Glauert factor $\beta \equiv \sqrt{1 - M_\infty^2}$. It consists of scaling down all y and z dimensions and angle of attack by the factor of $\beta,$ the potential by $\beta^2,$ and the x component of the normal vectors by $\beta$:

$$\begin{align}
\bar{x} &= x \\
\bar{y} &= \beta y \\
\bar{z} &= \beta z \\
\bar{\alpha} &= \beta \alpha \\
\bar{\phi} &= \beta^2 \phi
\end{align}$$

This $\bar{x}\bar{y}\bar{z}$ geometry will then have normal vectors whose x components are reduced by $\beta$ from the original ones:

$$\begin{align}
\bar{n}_{\bar{x}} &= \beta n_x \\
\bar{n}_{\bar{y}} &= n_y \\
\bar{n}_{\bar{z}} &= n_z
\end{align}$$

The small-disturbance potential equation then transforms to the Laplace equation,

$$\bar{\phi}_{\bar{x}\bar{x}} + \bar{\phi}_{\bar{y}\bar{y}} + \bar{\phi}_{\bar{z}\bar{z}} = 0 \quad \mbox{(in flow field)}$$

and the flow-tangency boundary condition retains the same form.

$$V_\infty \bar{n}_{\bar{x}} + \bar{\phi}_{\bar{y}} \bar{n}_{\bar{y}} + \bar{\phi}_{\bar{z}} \bar{n}_{\bar{z}} = 0 \quad \mbox{(on body surface)}$$

This is the incompressible potential-flow problem about the transformed $\bar{x}\bar{y}\bar{z}$ geometry. It can be solved by incompressible methods, such as thin airfoil theory, vortex lattice methods, panel methods, etc. The result is the transformed perturbation potential $\bar{\phi}$ or its gradient components $\bar{\phi}_{\bar{x}}, \bar{\phi}_{\bar{y}}, \bar{\phi}_{\bar{z}}$ in the transformed space. The physical linearized pressure coefficient is then obtained by the inverse transformation

$$C_p= -2\frac{\phi_x}{V_\infty} = -\frac{2}{\beta^2} \frac{\bar{\phi}_{\bar{x}}}{V_\infty} = \frac{1}{\beta^2} \bar{C}_p$$

which is known as Göthert's rule

== Results ==
For two-dimensional flow, the net result is that $C_p$ and also the lift and moment coefficients $c_l, c_m$ are increased by the factor $1/\beta$:

$$\begin{align}
C_p &= \frac{C_{p0}} {\beta} \\
c_l &= \frac{c_{l0}} {\beta} \\
c_m &= \frac{c_{m0}} {\beta}
\end{align}$$

where $C_{p0}, c_{l0}, c_{m0}$ are the incompressible-flow values for the original (unscaled) $xyz$ geometry. This 2D-only result is known as the Prandtl Rule.

For three-dimensional flows, these simple $1/\beta$ scalings do NOT apply. Instead, it is necessary to work with the scaled $\bar{x}\bar{y}\bar{z}$ geometry as given above, and use the Göthert's Rule to compute the $C_p$ and subsequently the forces and moments. No simple results are possible, except in special cases. For example, using Lifting-Line Theory for a flat elliptical wing, the lift coefficient is

$$C_L = \frac{2 \pi \alpha}{\beta + 2/AR}$$

where AR is the wing's aspect ratio. Note that in the 2D case where AR → ∞ this reduces to the 2D case, since in incompressible 2D flow for a flat airfoil we have $c_{l0} = 2 \pi \alpha,$ as given by Thin airfoil theory.

== Limitations ==
The PG transformation works well for all freestream Mach numbers up to 0.7 or so, or once transonic flow starts to appear.

== History ==
The interest in compressibility research emerged after the WWI, when the aircraft propeller tips started to reach M=0.8. Ludwig Prandtl had taught the transformation in his lectures about 1922, however the first rigorous proof was published in 1928 by Hermann Glauert. The introduction of this relation allowed the design of aircraft which were able to operate in higher subsonic speed areas. Originally all these results were developed for 2D flow. Göthert eventually realized in 1946 that the geometric distortion induced by the PG transformation renders the simple 2D Prandtl Rule invalid for 3D, and properly stated the full 3D problem as described above.

The PG transformation was extended by Jakob Ackeret to supersonic-freestream flows in 1925. Like for the subsonic case, the supersonic case is valid only if there are no transonic effect, which requires that the body be slender and the freestream Mach is sufficiently far above unity.

== Singularity ==
Near the sonic speed $M_\infty \simeq 1$ the PG transformation features a singularity. The singularity is also called the Prandtl–Glauert singularity, and the flow resistance is calculated to approach infinity. In reality, aerodynamic and thermodynamic perturbations get amplified strongly near the sonic speed, but a singularity does not occur. An explanation for this is that the linearized small-disturbance potential equation above is not valid, since it assumes that there are only small variations in Mach number within the flow and absence of compression shocks and thus is missing certain nonlinear terms. However, these become relevant as soon as any part of the flow field accelerates above the speed of sound, and become essential near $M_\infty \simeq 1.$ The more correct nonlinear equation does not exhibit the singularity.

== See also ==
- Ludwig Prandtl
- Hermann Glauert
- Jakob Ackeret
