= Terence Shone =

British diplomat (1894–1965)

Sir Terence Allen Shone KCMG (4 September 1894 – 29 October 1965) was a British diplomat who served as the United Kingdom's Minister to Syria and Lebanon from 1944, High Commissioner to India from 1946 and deputy Permanent Representative to the United Nations from 1948.

He was the son of Lieutenant-General Sir William Shone and Janet FitzGibbon, daughter of Gerald Fitzgibbon, Lord Justice of the Court of Appeal in Ireland. He was educated at Winchester College and University College, Oxford.
