= Gwen Alston =

British aerodynamicist and educationalist

- Born: Hannah Gwendolen Shone; 22 May 1907; Birkenhead, Cheshire, England
- Died: 14 July 1993 (aged 86)
- Education: University of Liverpool, University of Nottingham
- Known for: Flight-testing, aviation education, spinning tunnels
- Spouse: Peter Alston
- Awards: Scott-Farnie Medal
- Scientific career
- Fields: Aerodynamics
- Institutions: Royal Aircraft Establishment
- Academic advisors: Hermann Glauert

Hannah Gwendolen Shone (22 May 1907 – 14 July 1993) was a British aerodynamicist and educationalist most known for her work on spinning tunnels and aircraft flight-testing during World War II, as well as her involvement in flight education.

== Early life and education ==
Hannah Gwendolen Shone was born on 22 May 1907 in Birkenhead, Cheshire, the second eldest of eight children (five daughters and three sons) of Hannah (née Minshull) and Robert Harold Shone. Her father was a steel stockholding merchant and her mother a farmer's daughter. Her elder brother Sir Robert Minshull Shone became an influential economist and public servant in the field of iron and steel.

She was educated at Wallasey High School and Penrhos College, Colwyn Bay. She obtained a BSc in mathematics in 1927 and a diploma in education in 1928, both from the University of Liverpool.

While at university, she took flying lessons and obtained her private pilot's 'A' flying licence in 1929, gaining Royal Aero Club Aviator's Certificate No.9074 from Liverpool Aero club.

== Career ==
=== Teaching 1929-33 ===
After graduating from the University of Liverpool, Alston taught mathematics in Rotherham and Nottingham from 1929 to 1933 while simultaneously working towards a MSc in aerodynamics, which was awarded in 1932.

Throughout her consequent scientific career, Alston committed herself to the improvement and communication of aviation education.

=== Research scientist and flight test observer, RAE Farnborough 1933-45 ===
Alston joined the Royal Aircraft Establishment at Farnborough Airfield in 1933, working under Hermann Glauert and supervising the Aero department's spinning tunnel. She often flew as an observer on hazardous test flights as part of her research work.

During World War II, as well as her RAE work, Alston was seconded to Ringway Airport (now known as Manchester International Airport) to oversee problems with the introduction of troop-carrying gliders into the British Army's Glider Pilot Regiment. She completed the RAF basic and advanced pilot-training courses in Miles Magister and Harvard trainers, becoming a founder member and Adjutant of the RAF Technical Flight.

In 1944, Alston investigated the cause of Fairey Barracuda torpedo bomber accidents. Together with her pilot Eric Brown, she carried out test flights and found problems with flap positions in conjunction with rudder input to be the cause of the crashes. Brown later stated that "I cannot leave the accident investigation without paying tribute to one of the flight-test observers involved in these tests - Mrs Gwen Alston. Mrs Alston was a truly remarkable 'lady boffin', who, despite having lost her scientist husband in a fatal crash while on a similar duty, never flinched at any risky flight and in all circumstances displayed the essence of courage".

She was a founding member of RAF technical flight, the Aerospace Education and Recreation Organisation and became an associate of the Royal Aeronautical Society in 1956.

=== Inspector of Schools 1946-72 ===
In 1946, she was appointed as H. M. Inspector of Schools in England, by the Ministry of Education. Amongst her responsibilities, Alston was expected to give advice and inspect aeronautical matters, including educational training for the aviation industry, sport and recreational flying and air education in schools and colleges.

A speech she gave to the Women's Engineering Society in October 1956, entitled Technological Training and Employment of Women detailed the issues faced by girls in the education system who might be interested in careers in science or technology.

Alston retired in 1973.

== Personal life and family ==
Alston was an avid aviator, obtaining her flying license from the Royal Aero Club in 1929 and completing basic and advanced RAF pilot training.

Whilst working at Royal Aircraft Establishment at Farnborough Airfield in 1933, Alston met her future husband Peter Alston, a Civilian Scientific Officer, who died on 16 February 1939 near Eyke, Suffolk, while testing a military aircraft. The Royal Aeronautical Society's RP Alston Medal was first awarded in 1949 in memory of Alston's late husband. It was originally a prize for work in the field of air safety through stability and control but since 1957 has been awarded for practical achievement associated with the flight testing of aircraft. The medal features an eagle in flight with a hot air balloon in the background.

== Awards and honours ==
- In 1969, Alston became the first recipient of the Scott-Farnie Medal for her contribution to aviation education.
- In 1970, Alston became an Honorary Companion of the Royal Aeronautical Society.
