= William Shone (British Army officer) =

Sir William Shone
- Born: William Terence Shone; 8 March 1850; Kensington, London
- Died: 11 July 1938 (aged 88); Bournemouth, Dorset
- Relatives: Sir Terence Shone (son)
- Military career
- Allegiance: United Kingdom
- Branch: British Army
- Service years: 1871–1907
- Rank: Lieutenant-General
- Conflicts: Second Anglo-Afghan War; Third Anglo-Burmese War
- Awards: Knight Commander of the Order of the Bath; Companion of the Distinguished Service Order; Mentioned in Dispatches

Lieutenant-General Sir William Terence Shone, KCB, DSO (8 March 1850 – 11 July 1938) was a senior British Army officer.

== Military career ==
Shone was the son of John Allen Shone, barrister-at-law, and Eleanor, daughter of Terence Fitzgerald. He was educated at the Royal Military Academy, Woolwich and commissioned into the Royal Engineers on 4 January 1871. He first saw active service in the Second Anglo-Afghan War and was involved in the Mahsud Waziri Expedition of 1881. He served as Adjutant in the Royal Engineers and was Mentioned in Despatches during the Third Anglo-Burmese War. He was appointed a Companion of the Distinguished Service Order for operations in Burma. He was promoted to major in 1889 and served in the two Miranzai Expeditions in 1891. He served in 1895 with the Chitral Relief Force, as Commander of Royal Engineer Lines of Communication from 28 March to August 1895. He was subsequently appointed a Companion of the Order of the Bath. He was promoted brevet colonel in 1895, served with the China Field Force (1900-1) and as Chief Engineer and brigadier general. He was Director-General of Military Works in India from 1901 to 1903, was promoted to major general on 1 April 1902, and lieutenant general on 19 December 1903. He was Inspector-General of Fortifications, Army Headquarters, from 1903 to 1904 and was created a Knight Commander of the Order of the Bath in 1906. He retired from the regular army in 1907 and became Colonel Commandant of the Royal Engineers in 1918.

Shone married, in 1893, Janet, daughter of Gerald Fitzgibbon, Lord Justice of the Court of Appeal in Ireland and his wife Margaret FitzGerald, and they had one son, Sir Terence Shone (later British High Commissioner to India) and one daughter, Janet. He died on 11 July 1938.
