= William Shone (footballer) =

Welsh association football player

Personal information
- Full name: Watkin William Shone
- Date of birth: 1857
- Place of birth: Aston, Warwickshire, England
- Date of death: 1930
- Place of death: Shropshire, England
- Position: Forward

Senior career*
Years	Team	Apps	(Gls)
1878–1879	Oswestry		

International career
1879	Wales	1	(0)
- * Club domestic league appearances and goals

Watkin William Shone (born 1857; date of death unknown), commonly known as William Shone, was a Welsh footballer who played as a forward and made one appearance for the Wales national team.

== Career ==
Shone made his first and only international appearance for Wales on 18 January 1879 in a friendly against England. The away match, which was played in Lambeth, finished as a 1–2 loss for Wales.

== Career statistics ==
=== International ===
Wales
Year	Apps	Goals
1879	1	0
Total	1	0
