= Prandtl–Glauert singularity =

Theoretical construct in flow physics

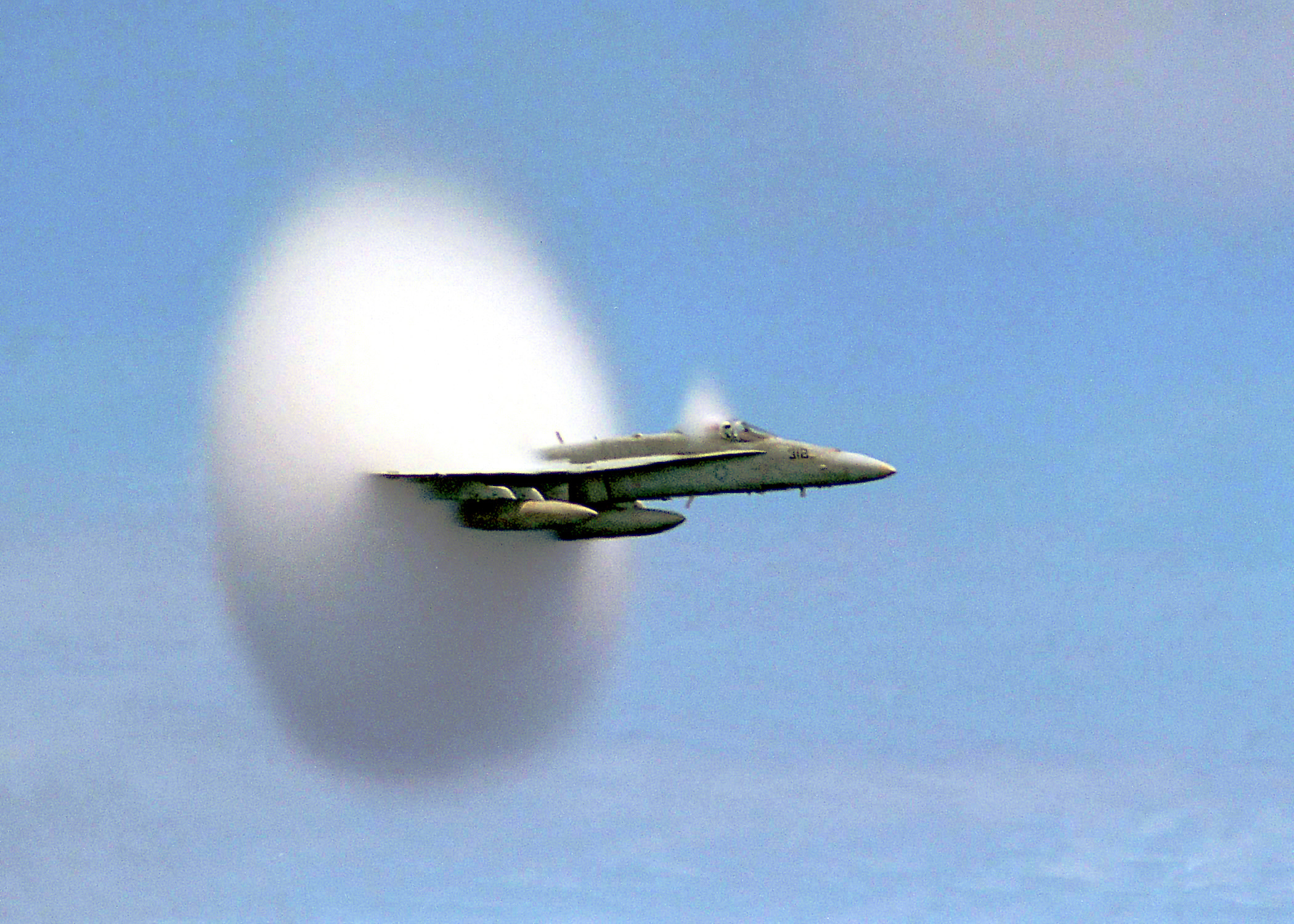
McDonnell Douglas F/A-18 Hornet jet aircraft flying at the speed of sound and producing supersonic expansion fans and a stern shockwave creating a vapor cone. The Prandtl–Glauert singularity was incorrectly predicted to occur under these conditions.

The Prandtl–Glauert singularity is a theoretical construct in flow physics, often incorrectly used to explain vapor cones in transonic flows. It is the prediction by the Prandtl–Glauert transformation that infinite pressures would be experienced by an aircraft as it approaches the speed of sound. Because it is invalid to apply the transformation at these speeds, the predicted singularity does not emerge. The incorrect association is related to the early-20th-century misconception of the impenetrability of the sound barrier.

== Reasons of invalidity around Mach 1 ==
The Prandtl–Glauert transformation assumes linearity (i.e. a small change will have a small effect that is proportional to its size). This assumption becomes inaccurate toward Mach 1 and is entirely invalid in places where the flow reaches supersonic speeds, since sonic shock waves are instantaneous (and thus manifestly non-linear) changes in the flow. Indeed, one assumption in the Prandtl–Glauert transformation is approximately constant Mach number throughout the flow, and the increasing slope in the transformation indicates that very small changes will have a very strong effect at higher Mach numbers, thus violating the assumption, which breaks down entirely at the speed of sound.

This means that the singularity featured by the transformation near the sonic speed (M=1) is not within the area of validity. The aerodynamic forces are calculated to approach infinity at the so-called Prandtl–Glauert singularity; in reality, the aerodynamic and thermodynamic perturbations do get amplified strongly near the sonic speed, but they remain finite and a singularity does not occur. The Prandtl–Glauert transformation is a linearized approximation of compressible, inviscid potential flow. As the flow approaches sonic speed, the nonlinear phenomena dominate within the flow, which this transformation completely ignores for the sake of simplicity.

== Prandtl–Glauert transformation ==
Plot of the Prandtl–Glauert transformation as a function of Mach number. Notice the infinite limit at Mach 1.

The Prandtl–Glauert transformation is found by linearizing the potential equations associated with compressible, inviscid flow. For two-dimensional flow, the linearized pressures in such a flow are equal to those found from incompressible flow theory multiplied by a correction factor. This correction factor is given below:
$$c_{p} = \frac {c_{p0}} {\sqrt {|1-{M_{\infty}}^2|}}$$
where

- c_{p} is the compressible pressure coefficient
- c_{p0} is the incompressible pressure coefficient
- M_{∞} is the freestream Mach number.

This formula is known as "Prandtl's rule", and works well up to low-transonic Mach numbers (M < ~0.7). However, note the limit:
$$\lim_{M_{\infty} \to 1 } c_p = \infty$$

This obviously nonphysical result (of an infinite pressure) is known as the Prandtl–Glauert singularity.

== Reason for condensation clouds ==
The reason that observable clouds sometimes form around high speed aircraft is that humid air is entering low-pressure regions, which also reduces local density and temperature sufficiently to cause water to supersaturate around the aircraft and to condense in the air, thus creating clouds. The clouds vanish as soon as the pressure increases again to ambient levels.

In the case of objects at transonic speeds, the local pressure increase happens at the shock wave location. Condensation in free flow does not require supersonic flow. Given sufficiently high humidity, condensation clouds can be produced in purely subsonic flow over wings, or in the cores of wing tips, and even within, or around vortices themselves. This can often be observed during humid days on aircraft approaching or departing airports.

== See also ==
- Prandtl–Glauert transformation
- Compressible flow
- Vapor cone
- Sonic boom
