= AES50 =

Digital audio standard

AES50 (SuperMAC)

Manufacturer info
- Manufacturer: Audio Engineering Society / Klark Teknik
- Development date: September 2011; 15 years ago

Network compatibility
- Switchable: No
- Routable: No
- Ethernet data rates: Fast Ethernet

Audio specifications
- Minimum latency: 62.5 μs
- Maximum channels per link: 48
- Maximum sampling rate: 44.1, 48, 88.2, 96 kHz
- Maximum bit depth: 24 bits

AES50 is an Audio over Ethernet protocol for multichannel digital audio. It is defined in the AES50-2011 standard for High-resolution multi-channel audio interconnection (HRMAI).

== Origins ==
AES50 is based on the SuperMAC protocol created by Sony Pro Audio Lab (now Oxford Digital). The preliminary standard was assigned the AES-X140 project designation in 2003, and was finally approved in 2005 as a royalty-free open standard.

HyperMAC is an improved protocol based on Gigabit Ethernet physical layer, allowing more channels and lower audio latency. It was considered for an alternate physical layer in a future revision of AES50, but standardisation did not move forward.

Sony licensed its proprietary software implementations of SuperMAC and HyperMAC to Midas Consoles for their Midas XL8 digital mixer. Midas parent Klark Teknik took over the SuperMAC and HyperMAC patents in 2007, then in 2009 Midas and Klark Teknik were acquired by Uli Behringer's Music Group.

The AES50 protocol is implemented in digital mixing consoles by Midas and Behringer to transfer digital audio between a console and remote stage boxes.

== Specifications ==
AES50 is a point-to-point interconnect which carries multiple channels of AES3, PCM or DSD bitstream formats, along with system clock and synchronisation signals, over shielded Cat 5 cable using a 100 Mbit/s Fast Ethernet physical layer.

AES50 uses the four pairs of the Cat 5 cable in the 8P8C connector:

1. Audio data transmit +
2. Audio data transmit –
3. Audio data receive +
4. Sync signal transmit +
5. Sync signal transmit –
6. Audio data receive –
7. Sync signal receive +
8. Sync signal receive –

Audio data is transmitted in bidirectional full-duplex mode over two differential pairs used by the 100BASE-TX standard, and word clock sync signal is transmitted over the remaining differential pairs not used by the Fast Ethernet layer. Using separate copper pairs for clock signal simplifies connection setup and allows phase-accurate low-jitter clock sync.

AES50 only employs the Ethernet protocol's physical layer (layer 1), relying on Ethernet frames to continuously stream audio data. A proprietary link layer (layer 2) implements a point-to-point audio transmission protocol. It uses a cyclic redundancy check (CRC) for each Ethernet frame and a Hamming code scheme can recover from individual bit errors. The audio data is interleaved so that neighbouring bits belong to different samples, allowing the receiving end to correct burst errors. Specialised cross-point routers can convert multiple point-to-point AES50 links to a centralised star topology.

The AES50 protocol supports 24-bit PCM audio and delta-sigma bistream formats (Direct Stream Digital), with sample rates that are a multiple of 44.1 or 48 kHz. The bandwidth of 100 Mbit/s allows 48 channels at 48 kHz sample rate, or 24 channels at 96 kHz sample rate. The latency is 6 samples at 96 kHz and 3 samples at 48 kHz, or 62.50 μs. In practical implementations of the SuperMAC and HyperMAC protocols, only 96 kHz PCM formats are supported.

AES50 also supports packet-based auxiliary channel for control data over the same data link. The control channel is allocated a fixed bandwidth of 5 Mbit/s; control data are embedded in the same Ethernet frame as the audio data.

== HyperMAC ==
HyperMAC

Manufacturer info
- Manufacturer: Klark Teknik

Network compatibility
- Switchable: No
- Routable: No
- Ethernet data rates: Gigabit Ethernet

Audio specifications
- Minimum latency: 41.66 μs
- Maximum channels per link: 392
- Maximum sampling rate: 44.1, 48, 88.2, 96 kHz
- Maximum bit depth: 24 bits

The HyperMAC protocol is based on the Gigabit Ethernet physical layer for Cat 5e cable (up to 100 m) or OM2 multi-mode fibre (up to 500 m) with embedded clocking. It allows up to 192 bidirectional channels at 96 kHz and 384 channels at 48 kHz; the latency is 4 samples at 96 kHz or 2 samples at 48 kHz, or 41.66 μs. The bandwidth of the auxiliary data link is increased to 200 Mbit/s and control data is transmitted with separate control frames.

== Implementations ==
- Midas Heritage D HD96-24 digital mixer
- Midas PRO Series digital mixers
- Midas M32 digital mixer
- Midas XL8 digital mixer
- Midas DL Series digital stage boxes
- Midas DL4xx Series Audio System Signal Router
- Midas Neutron Audio System Signal Router
- Behringer X32 digital mixer
- Behringer WING digital mixer
- Behringer S Series digital stage boxes
- Klark Teknik DN9620 AES50 Extender
- Klark Teknik DN9630 USB Interface
- Klark Teknik DN9650 Network bridge
