= Behringer X32 =

2012 digital mixing console by Behringer

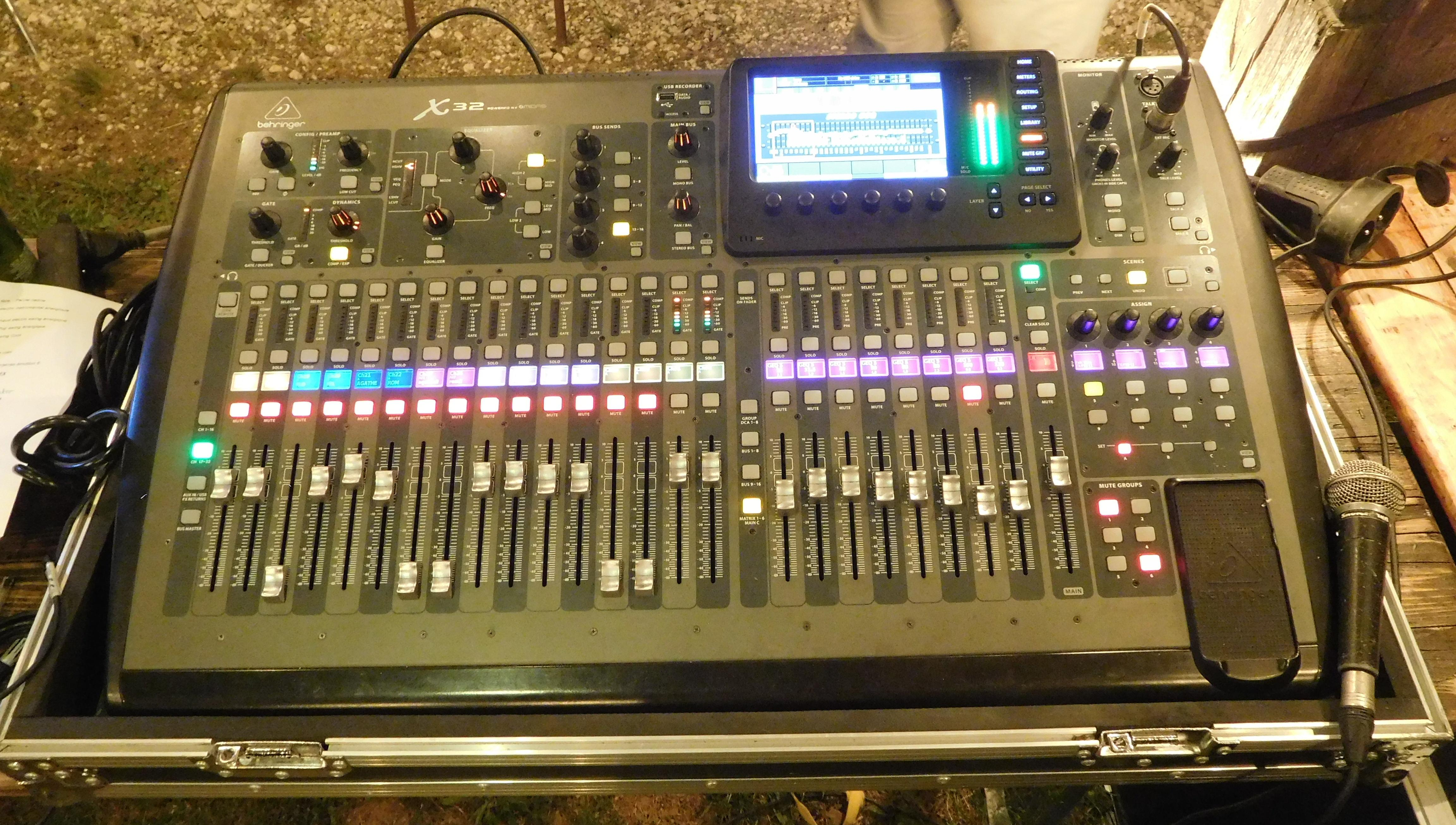
Behringer X32

The X32 Digital Mixing Console is a digital mixing console conceived and designed by German manufacturer Behringer. The console features 40-input channels, 25-bus, 32 XLR microphone input and 16 XLR output busses. The console features 25 100mm motorised faders, a user assignable control panel, Ethernet connectivity and an iPad and iPhone control application.

According to a 2019 statement posted to Facebook from owner Uli Behringer, the X32 had already sold 700,000 units, making it the best selling large format sound board in history.

In November of 2019 Behringer released the Wing console stating it was not intended to replace its X32 line, which it still manufactures.

== Background and impact ==
In 2010, Behringer's parent company, Music Group (later renamed Music Tribe), acquired British mixing console manufacturer Midas and signal processing company Klark Teknik. In 2012, utilizing design expertise and technology from all three companies, Behringer introduced the X32 as its flagship digital mixing console.

At the time of its introduction, the X32 established a previously unheard of cost-to-feature ratio for digital mixers, as competing products with similar features were at least twice the price of an X32, leading to widespread commercial success.

Within the next two years, several variants of the X32 were introduced, including the X32 Core, the X32 Rack, the X32 Producer, and the one the X32 Compact, with the X32 family of products becoming the best-selling digital console family.

In 2012, the X32 received a TEC Awards nomination for small format console technology, with the X32 Compact receiving a nomination in the same category the following year.
