= X32 =

X32 may refer to:

== Computing ==
- X.32, a telecommunications standard
- 32-bit computing
- IA-32, an instruction set architecture
- ThinkPad X32, a notebook computer
- x32 ABI, an application binary interface of the Linux kernel
- ×32, a PCI Express connector slot

== Other uses ==
- X32 (New York City bus)
- Boeing X-32, an American experimental aircraft
- Behringer X32, a digital audio mixing console
- X32, rolling stock of the Øresundståg train network
