= TC Electronic =

Danish audio equipment manufacturer

- A TC Electronic Eyemaster guitar effect pedal
- Industry: Guitar effects
- Founded: 1976; 50 years ago
- Founder: Kim and John Rishøj
- Headquarters: Denmark
- Area served: Global
- Products: guitar effects
- Website: www.tcelectronic.com

TC Electronic (sometimes stylized as t.c. electronic) is a Danish audio equipment company that designs and imports guitar effects, bass amplification, computer audio interfaces, audio plug-in software, live sound equalisers, studio and post-production equipment, studio effect processors, and broadcast loudness processors and meters. In August 2015, the company was purchased by Music Group, a holding company chaired by Uli Behringer.

== Company history ==
TC Electronic was founded by two musician brothers, Kim and John Rishøj. Their SCF, ("Stereo Chorus + Pitch Modulator & Flanger") was a successful early product. After initial success with guitar effect pedals, they developed 19" rack mounted processors, including the TC2290 delay released in 1985.

TC Electronic formed the TC Group in 2002 after acquiring TGI plc. TGI consisted of Tannoy, GLL Goodman, Lab Gruppen and Martin Audio. Martin Audio was sold quickly after the merger and Goodman Loudspeakers closed. TC Works (software development), based in Germany, was once part of the TC group, but reintegrated with TC Electronic in 2005.

The current TC Group is a holding company of five individual brand companies consisting of Tannoy, (speakers and studio monitors), Lab.Gruppen (amplifiers), TC Electronic, TC-Helicon (harmonisers and vocal processors) and TC|Applied Technologies (digital-audio semiconductor development) and the sales-companies TC Group|International, TC Group|Americas, TC Group|Japan, TC Group|China, and TC Group|Middle East.

TC Electronic also co-develops products with Dynaudio Acoustics (studio monitors) and their European sales arm TC Group|International distributes Blue Microphones outside of the US.

In August 2015, the company was purchased by Music Group, a holding company chaired by Uli Behringer. The parent company has since been rebranded as Music Tribe.

== Products ==
=== System 6000 ===
System 6000 is an audio mastering system built around the Mainframe 6000. It houses DSP-based electronics for processing and provides audio inputs and outputs. The Mainframe 6000 connects via Ethernet to either the Remote CPU 6000 and the TC ICON hardware controller, or to a computer running TC ICON emulation software. The System 6000 comes in two versions—Reverb 6000 and Mastering 6000. The two differ in included processing algorithms: Reverb 6000 comes with reverb and delay effects for stereo and multi-channel purposes, while Mastering 6000 comes with algorithms suited for stereo and multi-channel audio mastering, and includes pitch-shifting tools. Several optional algorithms are available separately. The System 6000 series was upgraded to MK2 in 2010.

=== Finalizer ===
The Finalizer is an audio mastering tool available two versions: Finalizer 96K and Finalizer Express. Both Finalizers have a compressor, limiter, equaliser and a Gain Maximiser. The Finalizer Express is a less-functional version of the Finalizer 96K that does not perform 96 kHz processing.

=== Guitar products ===
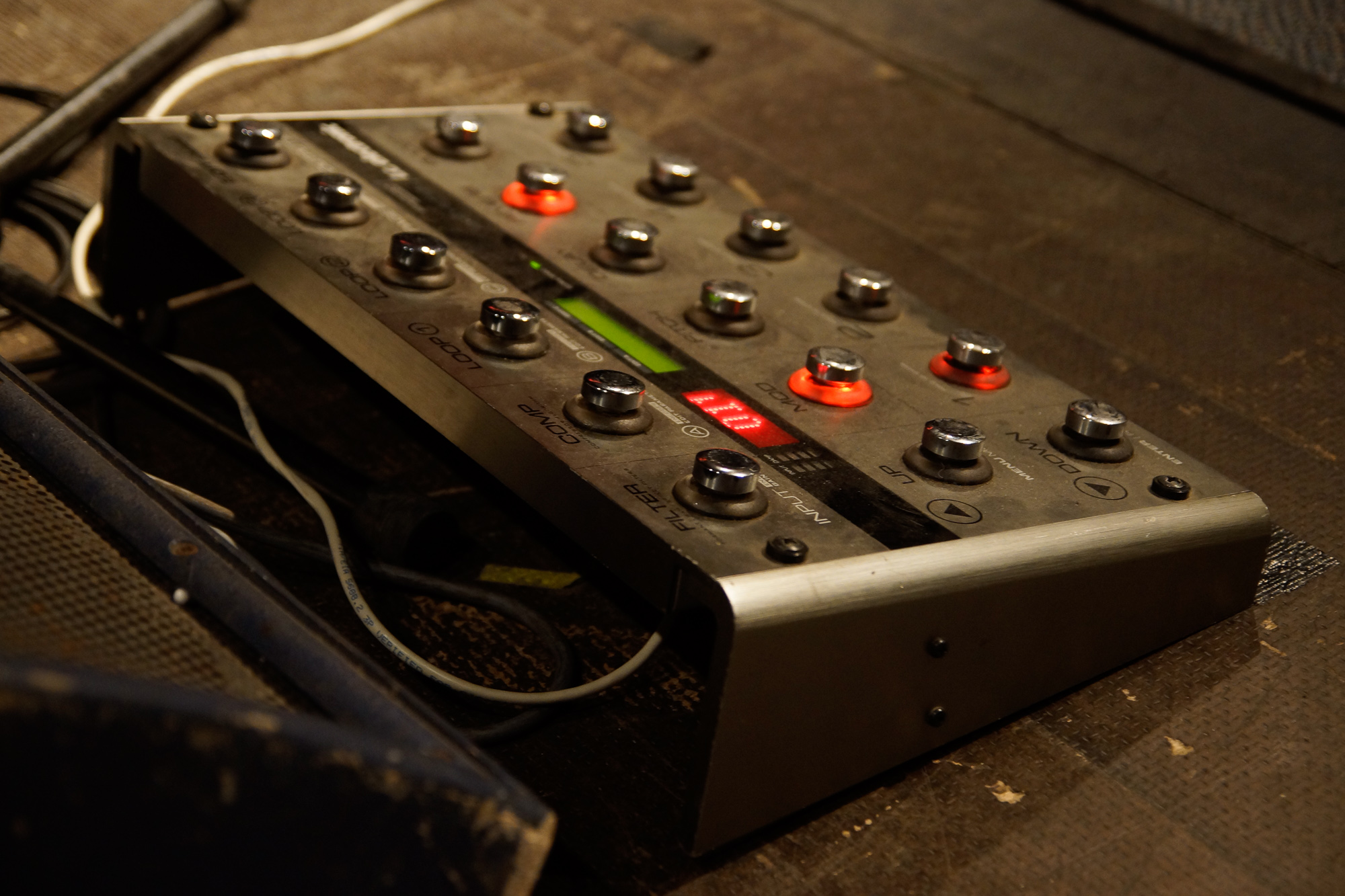
TC Electronic G System

Since the company began with guitar effects, the current line of TC Electronic products remain an important aspect of the company's business. There are several product categories:

- Nova - Includes a line of pedals (Delay, Reverb, Modulator, Drive) and the Nova System Multi Effects processor.
- G-Series - Includes the top of the range G System (floor processor and switching unit), the dedicated acoustic processor G Natural and rack processors G Major 2 and G-Force.
- Tuners - PolyTune (introduced 2010) is the world's first polyphonic guitar tuner.
- Compact Pedals - Includes the original SCF (Stereo Chorus Flanger), Ditto mini, HOF mini, VPD1, MojoMojo Overdrive and Dark Matter Distortion.
- TonePrint Pedals - Released at the NAMM Show in January 2010, these digital pedals have the ability to have TonePrints (custom presets by famous guitar & bass players) downloaded free from the TC website added and uploaded to the pedal via. a mini USB socket. Includes the Hall of Fame and Flashback II

=== Bass amplification products ===
In 2009, TC Electronic released a class D bass amplifier, RH450 (originally called RebelHead 450, but this name was cancelled later) along with the complementary RC 4 foot switch. In addition to this, TC Electronic developed a range of speaker cabinets for RH450 and other bass amplifiers: RS112 (1 × 12″ speakers), RS210 (2 × 10″ speakers), RS212 (2 × 12″ speakers) and RS410 (4 × 10″ speakers).

Also, shortly after presenting the RH450 at the NAMM Show in 2009, TC Electronic engaged a pilot program, selecting 24 bassists worldwide to test the amplifier at concerts and rehearsals.

=== PowerCore ===
PowerCore is a series of computer hardware and software, somewhat similar in concept to the DSP card in Digidesign's Pro Tools. At the base is a PowerCore unit that runs PowerCore VST or AU plug-ins. TC Electronic discontinued the PowerCore line in early 2011.

=== Studio equipment ===
TC Electronic produces equalizers, microphone preamplifiers, compressors, level maximizers, and multi-effect units (such as FireworX).

==== FireworX ====
FireworX is a multi-effects processor. Producers and DJs, such as Sasha, use or used Fireworx in conjunction with CD players for live performances. Fireworx won best Hardware Signal Processing Technology at the 1998 TEC Awards.

The unit itself incorporates effects such as distortion, compression, noise and curve generators, ring modulation, vocoding, parametric equalizers, tremolo, reverb and delay. The effects can be routed in a large variety of ways, and it is possible to modify different parameters.

=== PA, installation and broadcasting products ===
TC Electronic also produces equalizers for live use, gain maximizers, loudness controllers, and several products that reduce loudness variations during broadcasting. TC Electronic also has been a partner in developing loudness standardisation work with international standards bodies such as the ITU, ATSC and EBU.

=== Software ===
TC Electronic develops a range of plug-ins for its PowerCore system. They are all in the VST or AU formats, but cannot run without the PowerCore hardware. Some of these plug-ins are included with all of the PowerCore systems, except PowerCore Unplugged.

The plugins include equalizers, noise removal plugins, reverbs, analog filter banks emulators, compressors and psychoacoustic effects.

TC Electronic also authors plug-ins for the HD version of Digidesign's Pro Tools and Soundscape software. These plug-ins are also available in a PowerCore version (some of them are ported from the System 6000). They include vocal harmonisers, mastering plugins, reverbs and compressors.

==== Spark audio editor ====
TC Electronic also developed a two-track digital audio editor, which featured mastering tools and different effects.
