= TC Group =

- Industry: Audio Electronics and Speakers
- Founded: 1998; 28 years ago
- Defunct: 2015
- Fate: Acquired by MusicTribe
- Headquarters: Risskov, Denmark
- Area served: Worldwide
- Products: Effects processors and speakers for performance, installation & broadcast.
- Website: tcelectronic.com

TC Group was a Danish multinational corporation specializing in audio related products for musicians, installers, producers, engineers, broadcasters, audio consultants and contractors. Its individual brands include Lab.gruppen, Lake, Tannoy, TC-Applied Technologies, TC Electronic and TC-Helicon. Overall, the company organizes itself around four market verticals: Musician, Install & Tour, Broadcast & Production, and Residential. TC Group was acquired by Music Tribe in 2015.

TC Group's products include audio effects and amplification devices for singers, guitar players, and bass players; performance speakers and amplifiers; loudspeakers and amplifiers for installation, including ceiling speakers and column speakers; and processing and metering for broadcast and production.

== Company history ==
TC Group is composed of several companies that precede its 1998 formation, most notably Tannoy (1926) and TC Electronic (1976).

=== Before TC Group ===
Tannoy is the Scotland-based manufacturer of loudspeakers and PA (public address) systems. It was founded as the Tulsemere Manufacturing Company in London and moved to its present headquarters in Coatbridge, Scotland in the 1970s. The name Tannoy is derived from a contraction of the term "tantalum alloy," which was a metal used in the early development of the company's products. Tannoy became a household name as a result of supplying PA systems to the armed forces during World War II and to Butlins and Pontins holiday camps after the war. They subsequently became known for the high fidelity sound reproduction of their dual concentric speakers in the late 1940s. This was followed by many speakers for professional, touring and high-end residential applications.

SCF Stereo Chorus Flanger

TC Electronic is located in Aarhus, Denmark, in the district of Risskov. It was founded by brothers Kim and John Rishøj, whose engineering goal was to produce guitar pedal effects which significantly reduced unwanted signal noise. The resulting product was the Stereo Chorus, Pitch Modulator and Flanger. This became known by guitar players as "SCF". TC Electronic has since produced a variety of guitar and bass effects and has also branched out into the area of broadcast and transmission.

=== Foundation ===
As TC Electronic moved to acquire other companies, it created an entity called TC Works. On October 10, 1998, TC Group became incorporated, beginning a process of strengthening links between itself, Tannoy, and TC Electronic as well as acquiring other audio-related companies and developing distribution deals with audio technology manufacturers.

=== Acquisitions ===
In 2000, TC Group created a joint venture with IVL Technologies Ltd that resulted in TC-Helicon: a company devoted to the creation of audio technology focusing on singers. TC Group purchased the remaining shares from IVL in 2005 and has continued to develop this company as TC-Helicon. In 2002, TC Group acquired Tannoy and Martin Audio with the intention of developing speaker technology. A year later, Martin Audio purchased the company from TC Group, though Tannoy remains a part of TC Group to the present time.

=== TC Group Today ===
In the remainder of the past decade, TC Group unified its business operations and organised its brands by market segments; it also created distribution networks in North America in 2009 (TC Group Americas) and China in 2010 (TC Group International), which base sales and support on vertical markets across all TC Group brands. In April 2013 at the Musikmesse/Prolight+sound in Frankfurt, TC Group announced a new branding initiative that saw its companies become more intentional in sharing their vision and values as a combined group presence while retaining their separate identities. This change has included increased collaboration between companies for product development, global sales, and support as a facet of the collective TC Group, and it has also produced a new shared logo and new web presence. The business structure and customer contact points within the individual companies were not affected as a result of this initiative.

== Historically Significant Products ==
Historically significant products produced by TC Group companies include the first dual concentric monitor by Tannoy in the mid-twentieth century. In contrast to speakers that have a separate woofer (low-frequency speaker) and tweeter (high-frequency speaker), Tannoy placed the tweeter behind the center of the medium or bass woofer. The first speaker to use this design was the "Concentric Dual," popularly referred to as the "Monitor Black," which made its debut in 1947. This design remained the basis for all Tannoy dual concentrics for about thirty years. Although other companies have produced dual concentric speakers since then, Tannoy was the first company to register the term "dual concentric."

Amplifier technologists at Lab.gruppen (est. 1979) introduced a proprietary intercooler, which uses thousands of copper fins to multiply the exposed heatsink surface’s rapid heat dissipation. They also developed a Regulated Switch Mode Power Supply (R.SMPS™) for high-powered amplifiers. Its implementation was made possible when Siemens introduced its first high-voltage MOSFET devices. Electric guitar innovations include the aforementioned Stereo Chorus Flanger (SCF), noted for its low signal noise, and the TC Electronic Finalizer, an audio mastering tool that combined a multiband EQ, multiband compressor, limiter and expander for digital recording.

In the 1990s, TC Electronic developed the M2000 and the M5000 - digital audio mainframes/multi-effects processors making use of trademarked software to produce analog-sounding effects. The algorithms covered Reverb (Hall, Room, Plate, Ambience, and Gated); Chorus; Flanger; Delay; Phaser; Multi Pitch Shift (up to six voices); EQ; Tremolo; Stereo Spatial Control; and Dynamics, the latter covering compression, limiting, gating and de-essing.

TC-Helicon registered its trademark for its VoiceLive technology (harmony, correction and effects which has as its focus the creation of produced sounds for live performance settings. Trademarked features include VOS™ Limiter, HybridShift™ harmony generation, FlexTime™ and HarmonyHold™ (for harmonies). They also created the concept of a mic-stand mounted speaker/monitor for singers (VoiceSolo).

=== Noteworthy Current Products ===
Among the products currently produced by TC Group brands are Lab.gruppen's PLM (Powered Loudspeaker Management) Series amplifiers, which have seen extensive use in music performance applications such as the 2014 Ultra Music Festival Korea in Seoul, South Korea as well as in arenas and stadia such as the BC Place stadium in Vancouver, the largest use of the amplifiers to date, where the number of PLM units totals 157. The PLM 20000Q also won a TEC Award in 2012 for Outstanding Technical Achievement.
