= TC Works Spark =

Digital audio editor

- Developer: TC Electronic
- Operating system: Mac OS 9, Mac OS X
- Type: digital music creator and audio editor
- License: Proprietary

TC Works Spark was a 2-track audio editing application for the Mac OS 9 and Mac OS X, developed by TC Works, the former computer recording subsidiary of TC Electronic, from 1999 to 2003. Spark was discontinued in around 2004.

== Features ==
- 2 track audio editing
- CD burning
- Audio processing with included or third party VST or AU plug-ins
- Audio analysis tools
- Batch conversion
- Noise reduction tools

== Variants ==
Spark was available in these versions:

- Spark ME – a free version available for download from the TC Works website.
- Spark LE – a version bundled with early TC PowerCore cards
- Spark LE Plus – a version only available for purchase from the TC webshop
- Spark XL – the flagship application, bundled with several audio plug-ins
- Spark – the predecessor to Spark XL
- Spark Modular – a collection of software modules for building your own modular synthesizer
- Spark FX Machine – a matrix similar to the one found in the TC Electronic FireworX hardware unit
