= Music group (disambiguation) =

A music group or musical ensemble is a group of two or more musicians who perform instrumental or vocal music.

Music group or Music Group may also refer to:

- The Music Group, a former European musical instrument parent company which purchased companies from Boosey & Hawkes
- Music Group (company), an audio and music products holding company
- Music organization
