= Badminton Theater =

Theatre in Athens, Greece

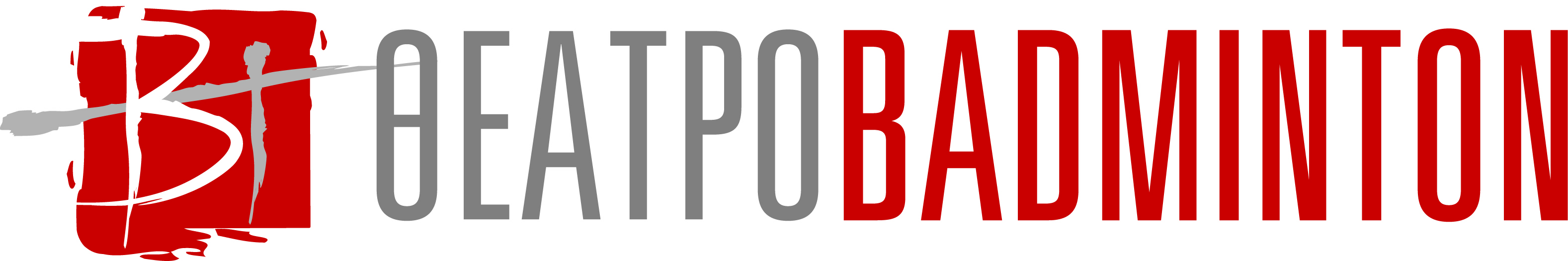

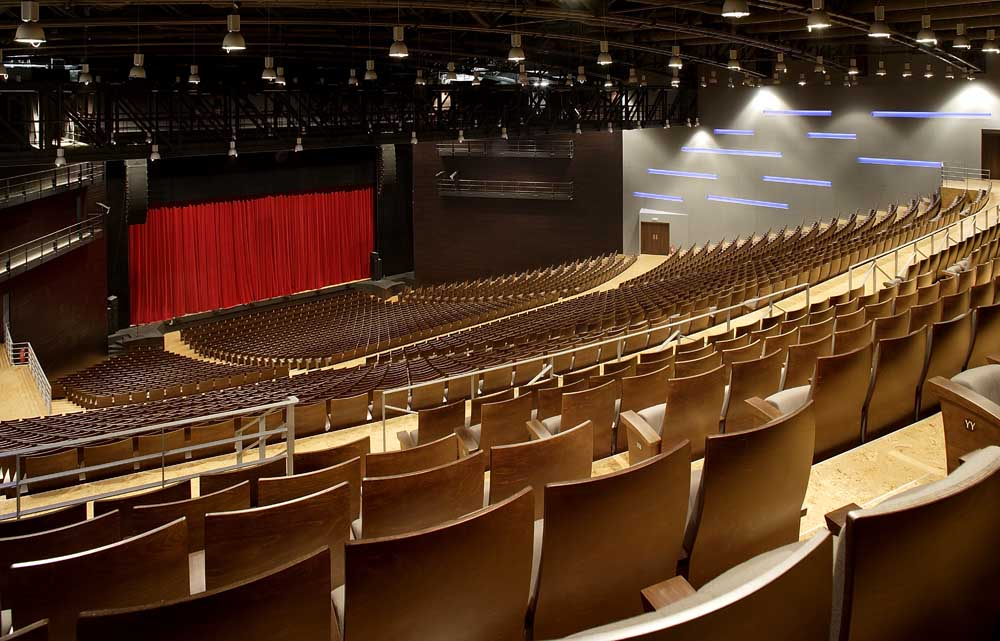
- The auditorium in May 2009
- Interactive map of Badminton Theater
- Former names: Goudi Olympic Hall (2004)
- Location: Goudi, Athens, Greece
- Coordinates: 37.9861°N 23.7747°E
- Owner: ABCD
- Capacity: 8,000 (Olympics); 2,430 (theatre)

Construction
- Built: 2004 (as Olympic venue)
- Opened: 2007
- Renovated: 2006–2007
- Demolished: August 2026–present

Website
- Official website

The Badminton Theater (Greek: Θέατρο Badminton) was a venue utilized for the staging of medium- and large-scale multiplex events. Situated inside the metropolitan park of Goudi in Athens, Greece, the theater was originally designed to host concerts, plays, dance performances and musicals. As of 2012, conferences, meetings, presentations and corporate events are also held at the venue due to the construction of additional facilities.

== History and architectural transformation ==
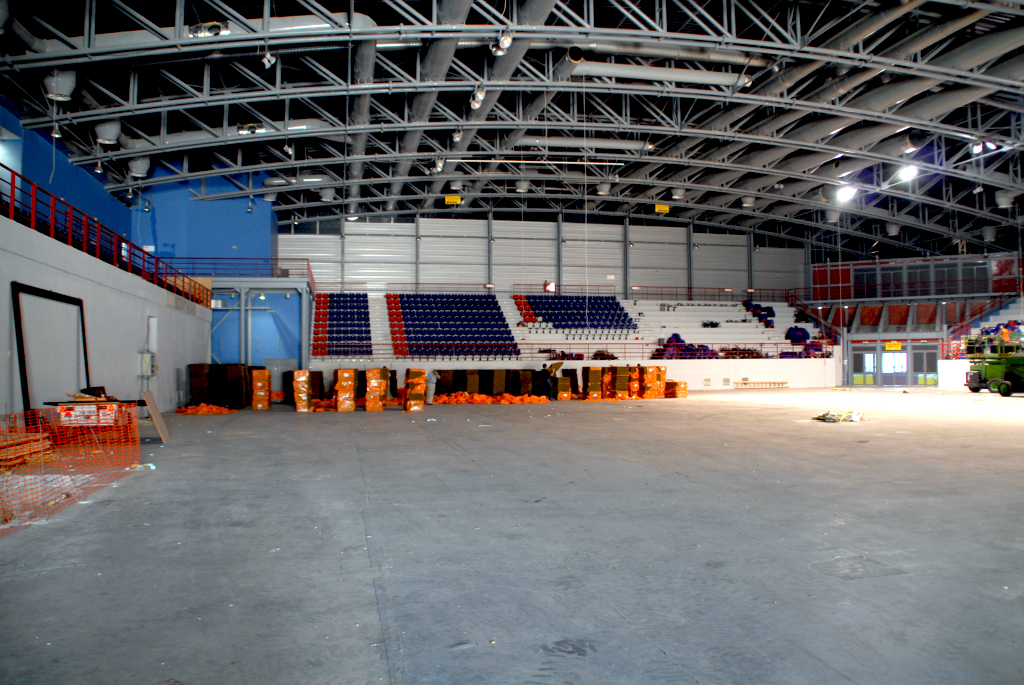
Pre-Transformation

The venue was initially built as part of Goudi Olympic Complex and used for the sport of Badminton during the 2004 Olympic Games, opening immediately before the games. As the venue became further established, the facility was made available for leasing, with the management utilizing a public tender process, and "Athens Badminton Cultural Development S.A." (ABCD) outbid. ABCD acquired the premises for a 20-year timeframe, and subsequently embarked on radical reform and development of the property.

=== Reconstruction ===
The building was eventually converted into a versatile facility, suitable for medium- and large-scale events. The remodeling work began in the summer of 2006 and was completed in 2007, with investment exceeding 16 million euros. The post-industrial style of the exterior and the venue's large open spaces were the only things that remained intact. The interior was entirely rebuilt to create a modern auditorium, capable of seating 2,430 people, surrounded by foyers and halls.

The Badminton Theater has been used in several major international theater, dance and television productions and conferences.

=== Demolition ===
In August 2026, the theater started getting demolished by the ministry's order.

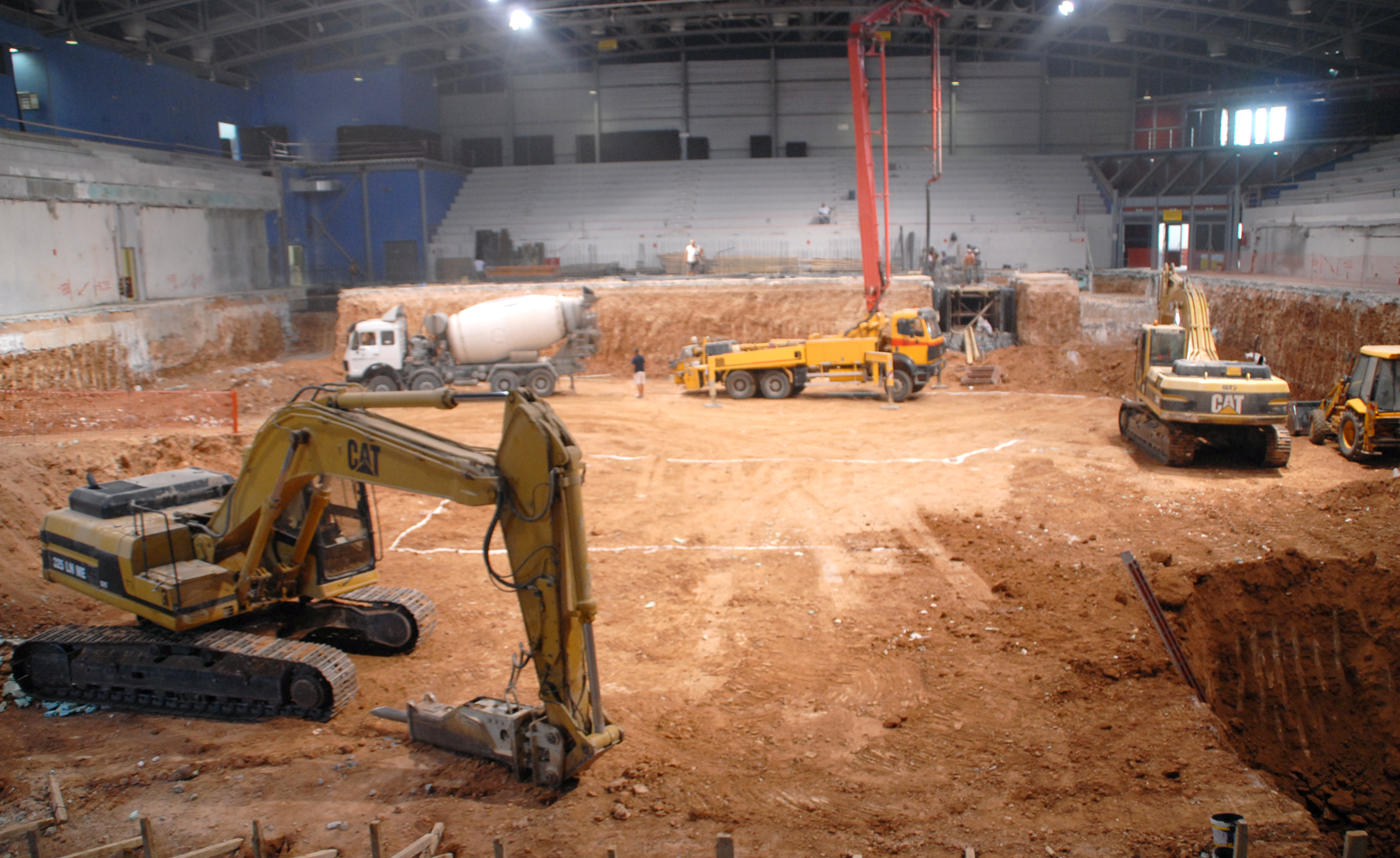
Phase 1

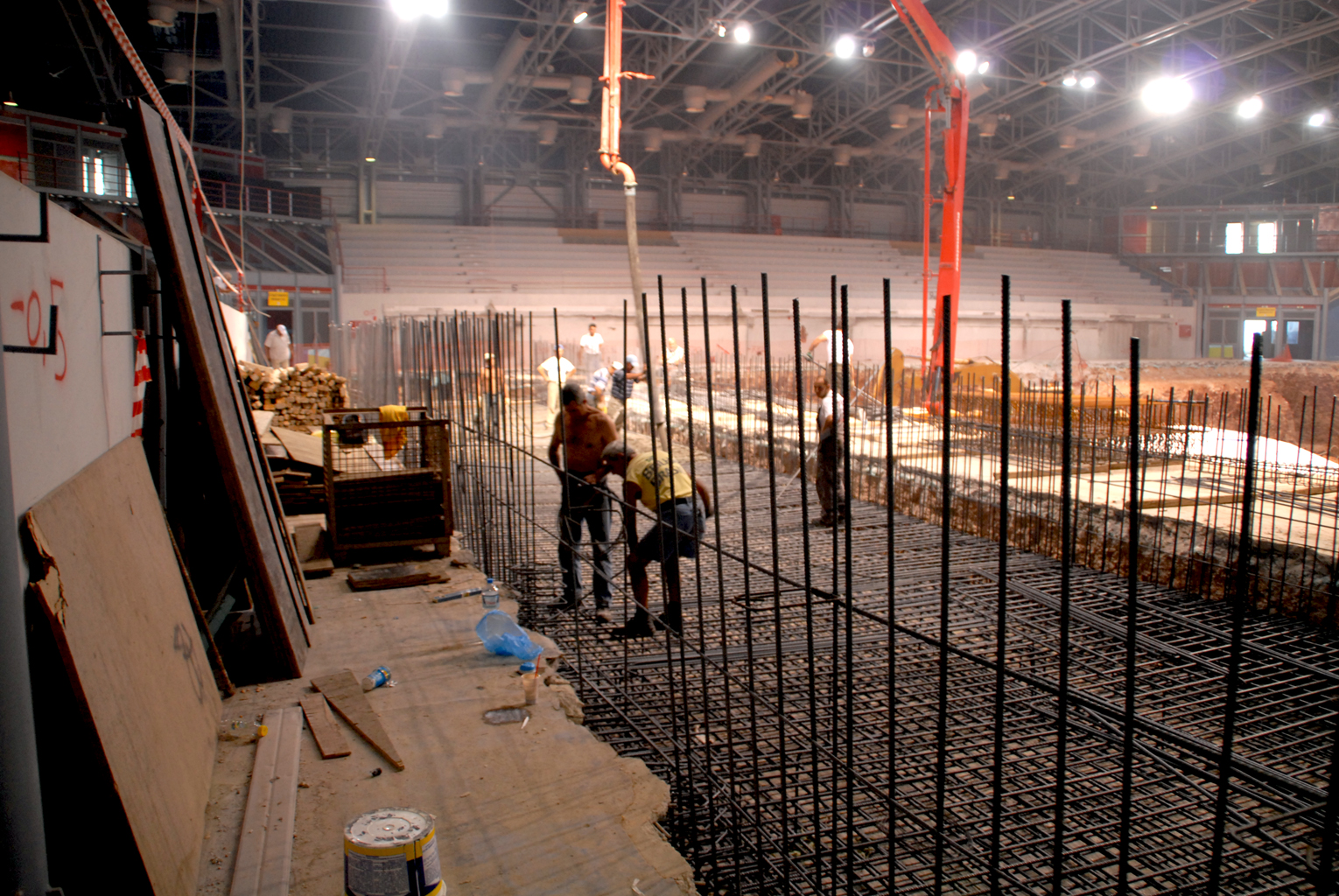
Phase 2

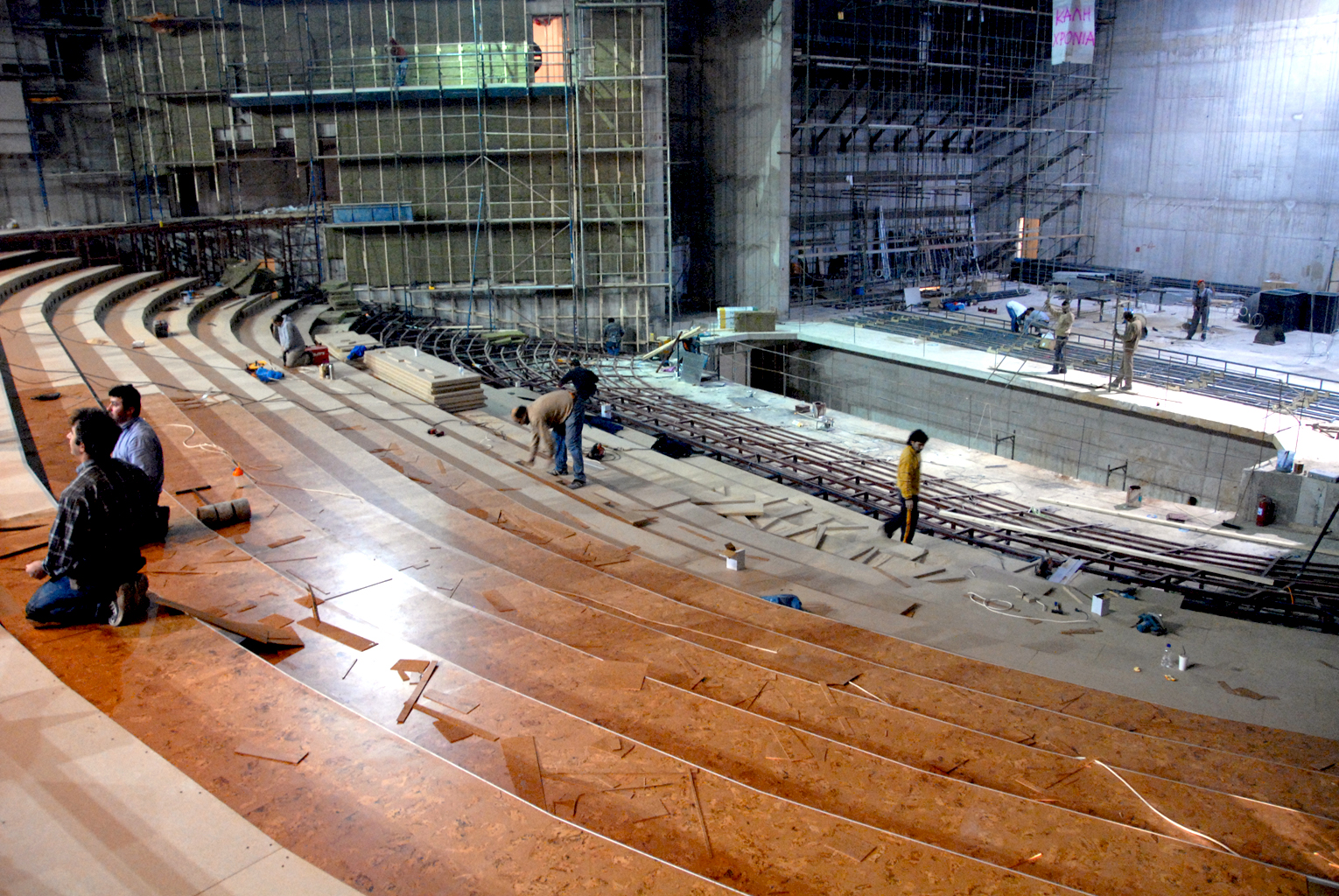
Phase 3

== The Theater ==
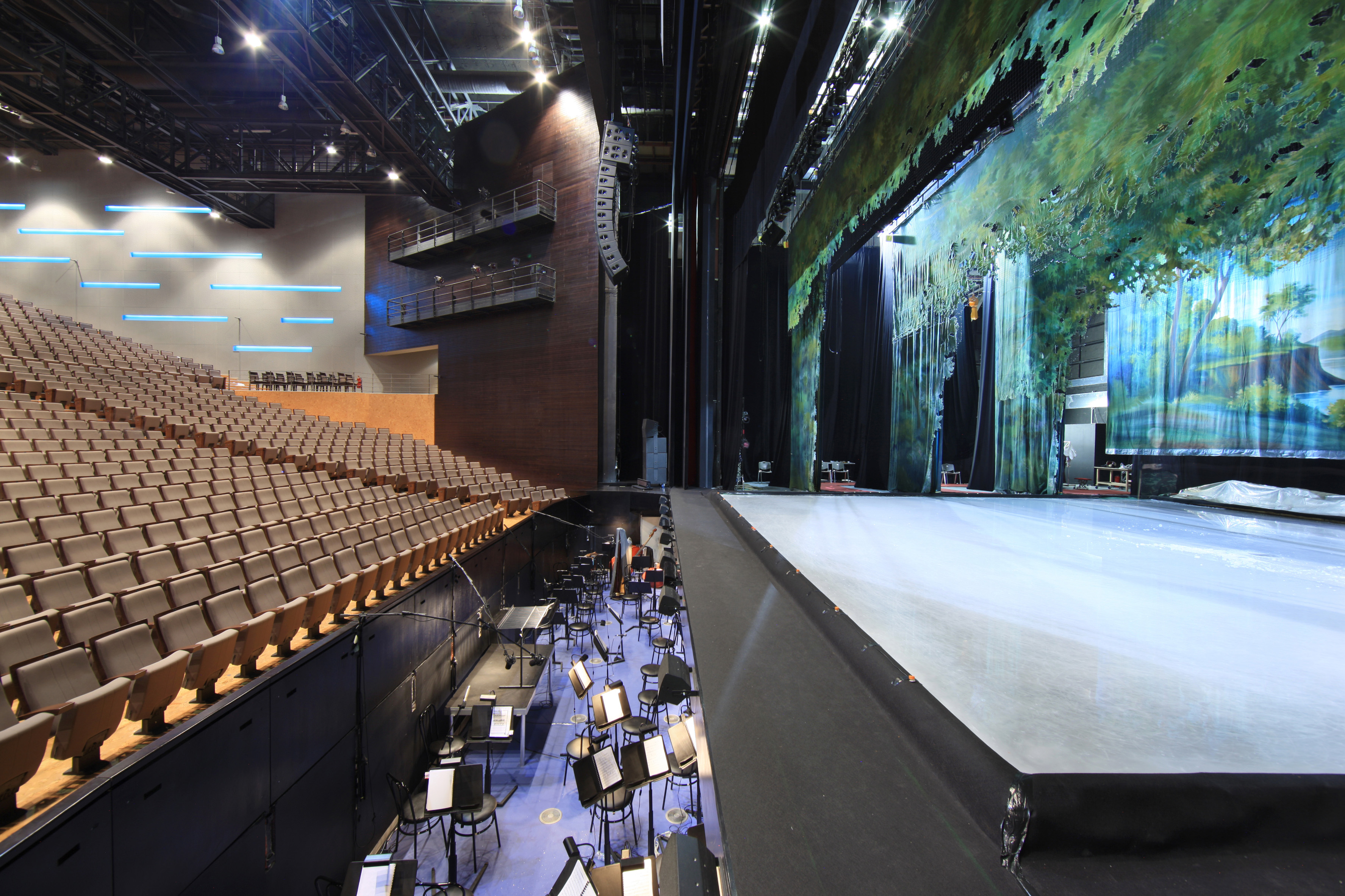
Badminton Theater Auditorium

The main areas of Badminton Theater are:

=== The Auditorium ===
The Badminton Theater Auditorium was the largest of its kind in Greece. The stage is 30-meter wide, with a depth of 18 meters, while the ceiling height is 15.5 meters, and is equipped with a programming console (Vatalpha Type) that is capable of changing the scenery appearance in a matter of seconds. For conferences and corporate events, the stage accommodates panels of speakers and presentations, with a central podium also available to guests. The image viewer can also be used to convert the scene into a viewing area. High quality projectors are employed for the lighting of the area; lighting equipment includes 200-inch dimmers, a "Congo ETC" lighting console, and five LED panels for displays and the projection of subtitles.

The ergonomic design of the theater provides unobstructed visibility and, for events that require a greater immediacy for a smaller audience, a mobile partition can be employed.

The acoustics of the venue are capable of an average reverberation time of less than 1.1 seconds audio in the room is evenly distributed to within ± 2 decibels (db) from point-to-point and the central console is a digital 96-channel "MIDAS XL 8". The acoustic design of the theater was completed by Theodore Timagenis, an acoustic design consultancy firm founded in 1975.

=== The Foyer ===
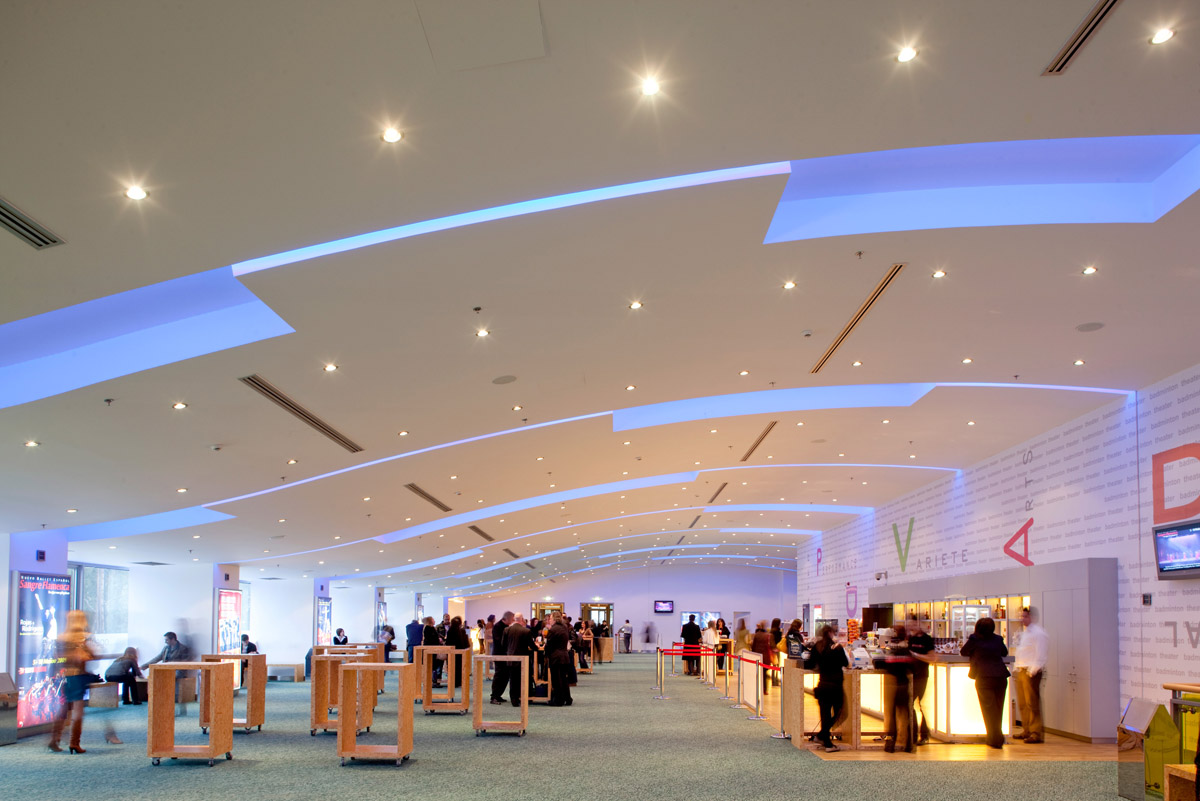
Foyer.

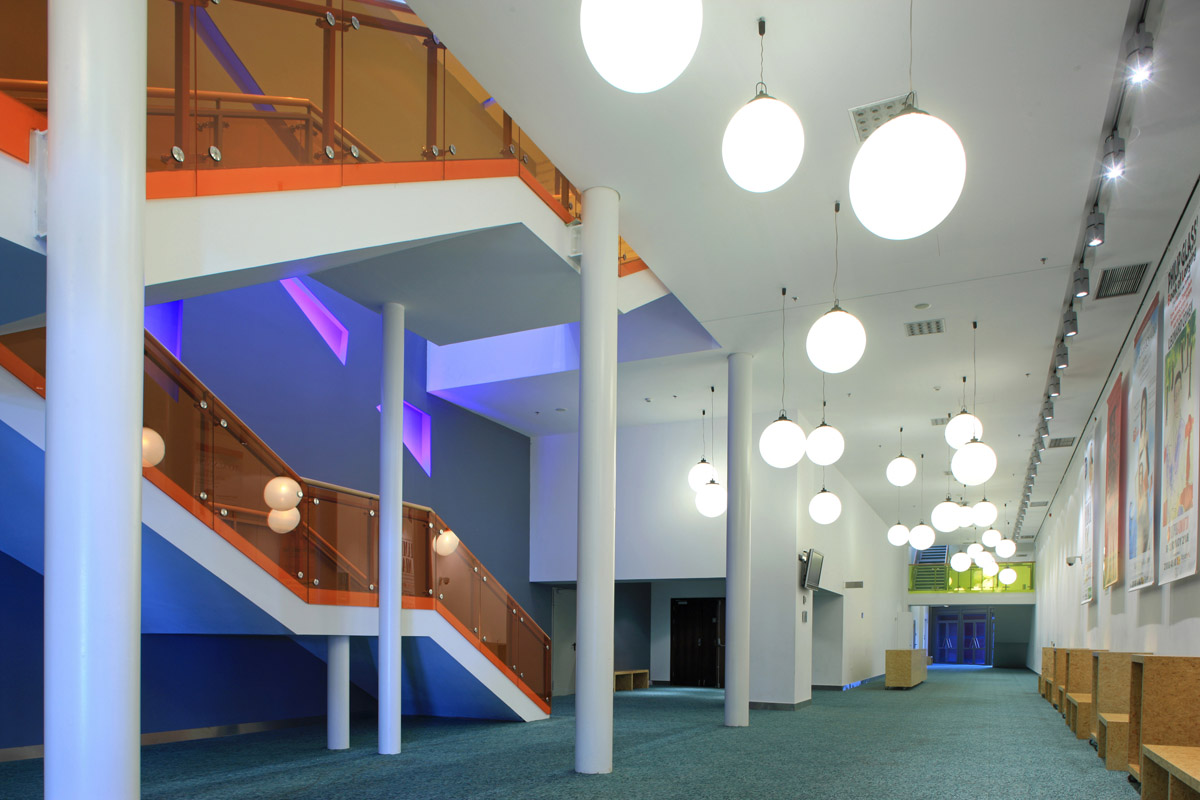
Lower Tier.

The foyer consists of two multi-use areas that collectively occupy more than 1,500 square meters (sq. m.) of space.

The Upper Foyer, the main reception area for visitors, consisted of banners with an internal lighting mechanism and flat screens for the viewing of video material. The Upper Foyer also overlooked Army Park and was illuminated by natural lighting. This main reception area was connected to the lower level by two open stairwells and an elevator. The Lower Foyer connected with the lower tier of the amphitheater and consisted of allocated smoking rooms.

=== The Hallway ===
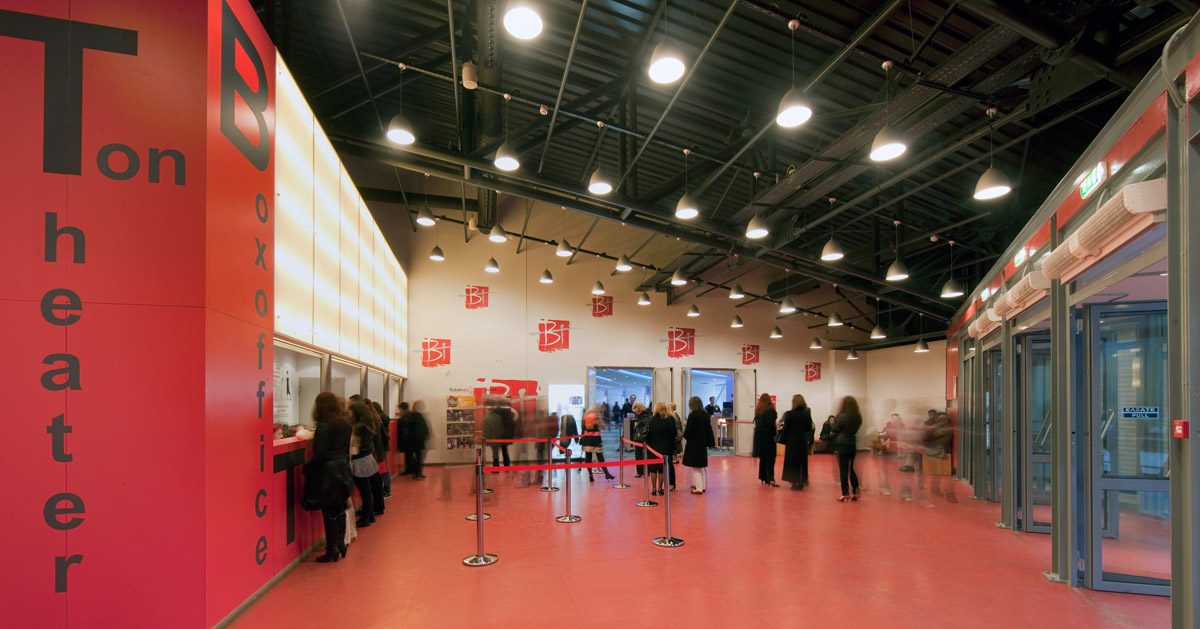
Hallway.

The Hallway was the main reception area for visitors. The most common uses for the receipt of tickets, registering participants and screened. In this area, there were 8 service counters, hung flat screen TFT panels and illuminated system (banners), buffer flow control for the increased attendance and lift for disabled people. In March 2012, Badminton Theater implemented an electronic barcode check-in system.

=== Additional Support Infrastructure ===
Apart from the aforementioned areas, Badminton Theater features additional infrastructure, serving the diverse needs of individual events, including:

- Administration offices
- Backstage Space
- Dressing Rooms
- Rehearsal Room
- Technical Amphitheater
- Green Room
- Meeting Hall (maximum capacity: 300 people)
- Press Room (70 people)
- Large storage areas
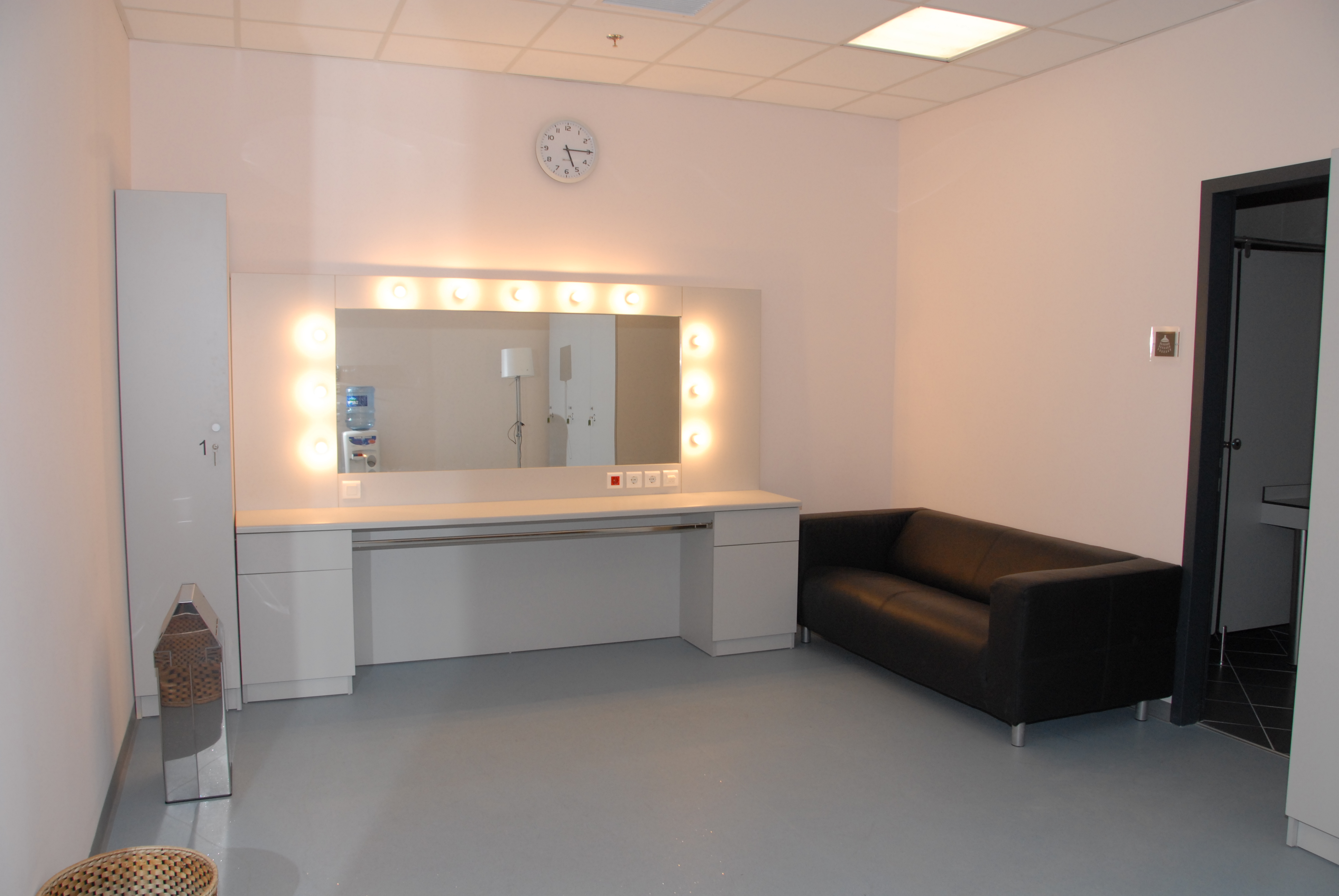
Badminton Theater Dressing Room

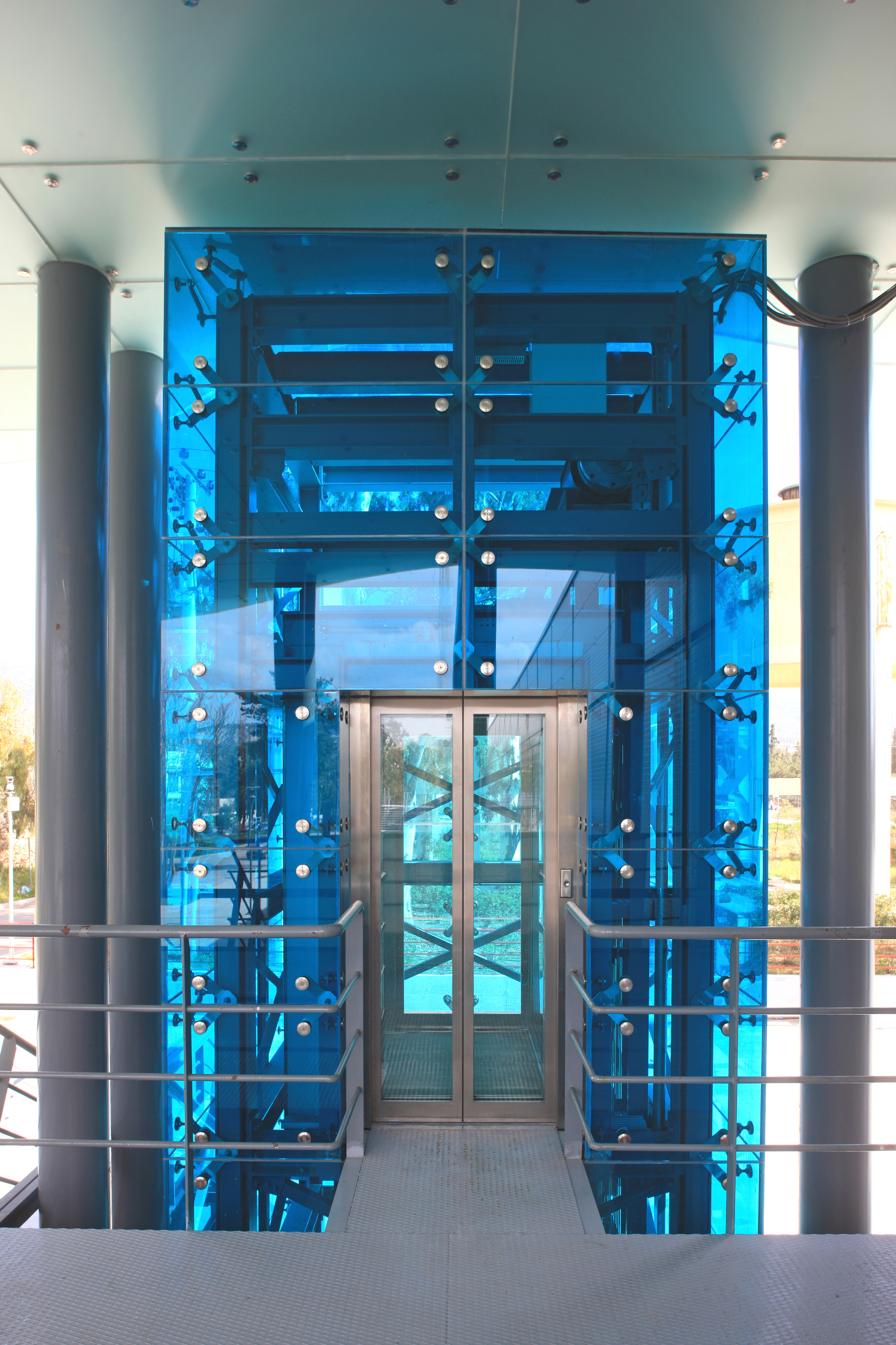
Badminton Theater Lift

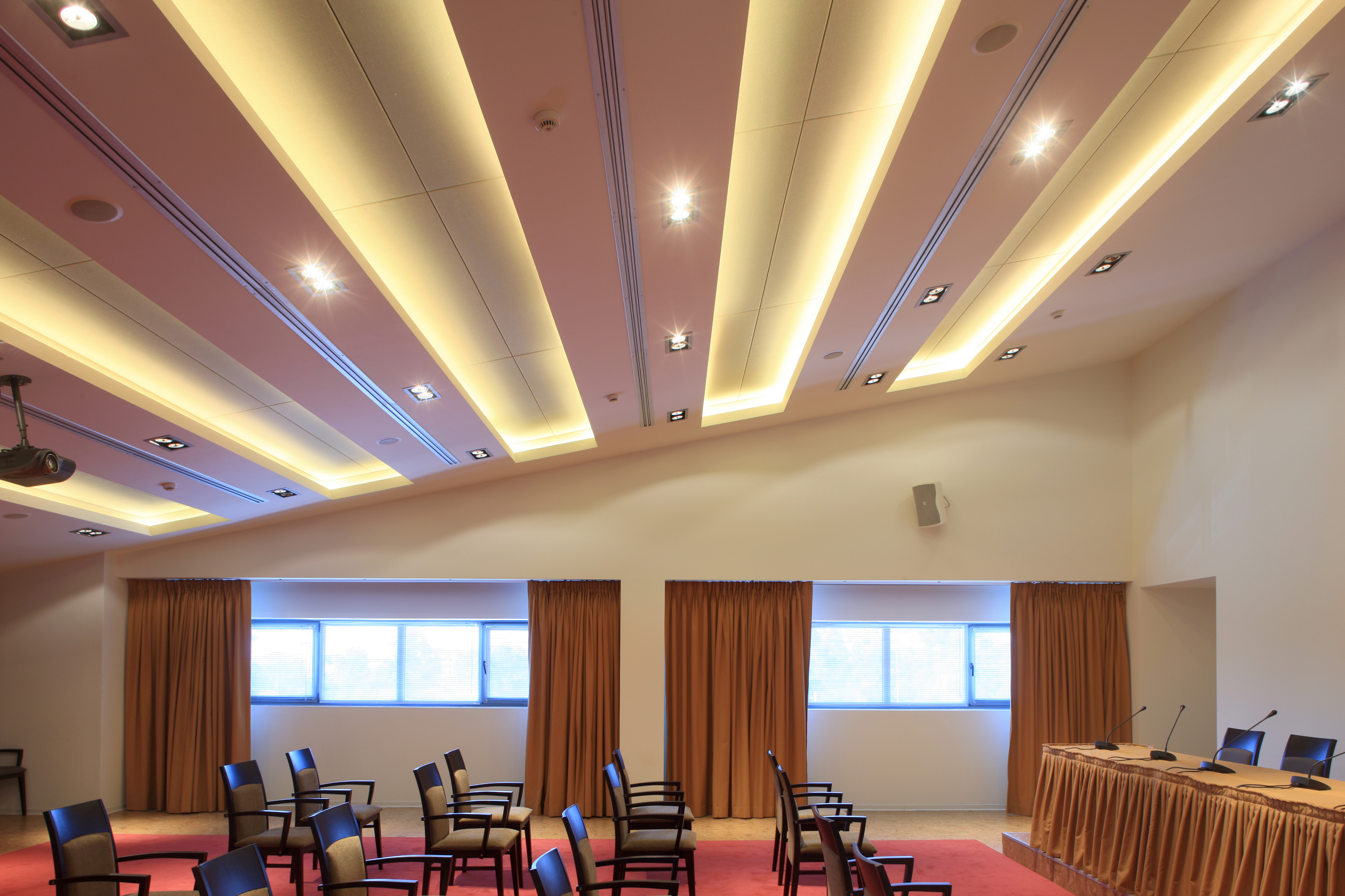
Badminton Theater Press Room

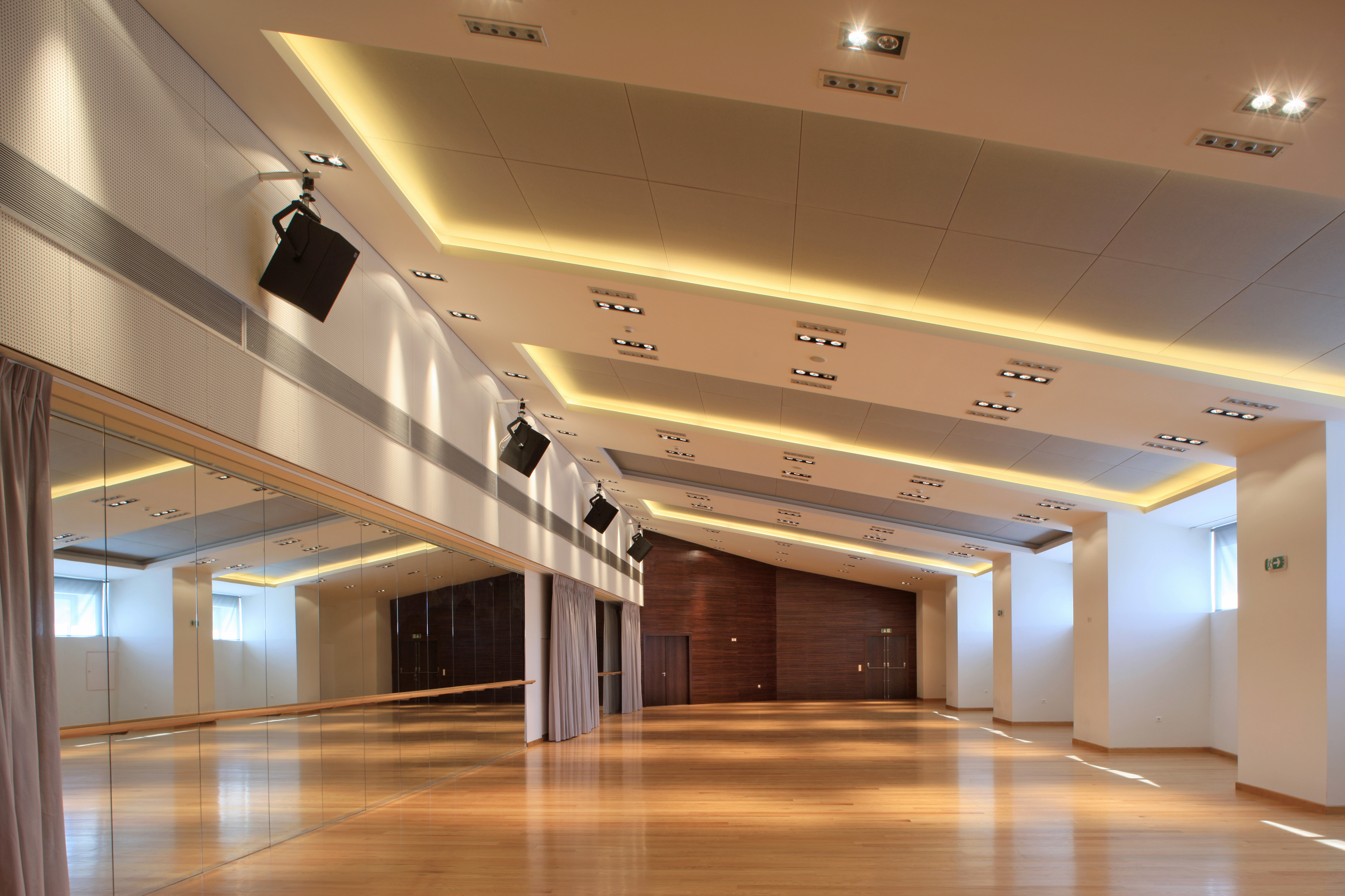
Badminton Theater Rehearsal Room

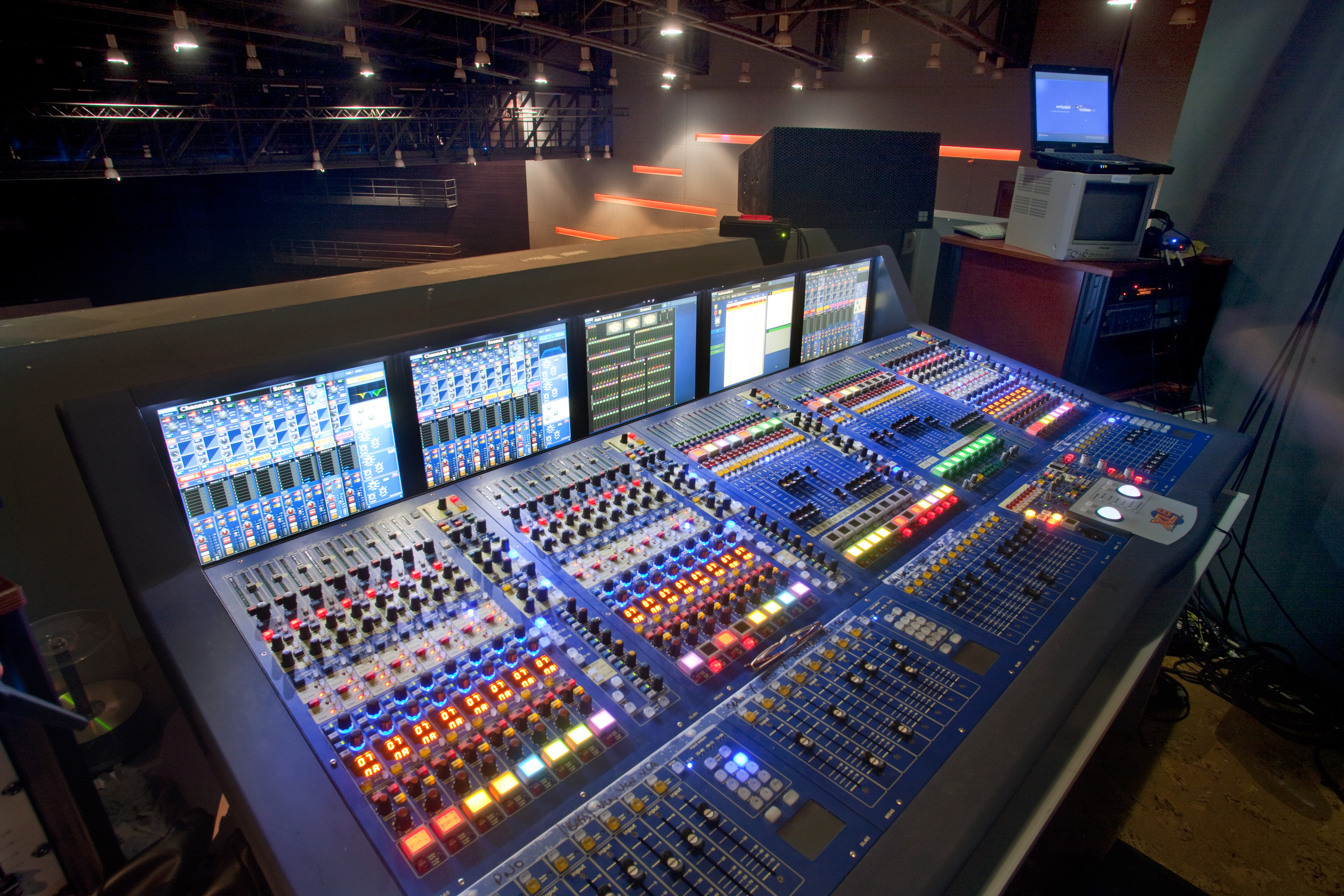
Badminton Theater Booth

== Access ==
The Badminton Theater was located inside the area of the metropolitan park of Goudi, at the junction of Mesogeion and Katechaki/Kanelopoulou Avenues (Goudi area), with easy access from "Katehaki" Metro station (Line 3) and bus lines.

The outdoor space around the complex hosted more than 800 vehicles, or more than 70 buses, through the entrances from Mesogeion Avenue (Former Police Academy) and Katechaki/Kanellopoulou Avenue.

== Events ==
=== 2007 ===
- Matthew Bourne's Swan Lake: 31 January – 11 February 2007
- Dean Perry's Tap Dogs: 20 – 25 March 2007
- Jesus Christ Superstar: 18 April – 14 May 2007
- Tiger Lillies: 1 – 10 June 2007
- Lord of the Dance: 18 – 28 June 2007
- Cristina Hoyos - Viaje al Sur: 26 – 28 September 2007
- BoccaTango: 4 – 8 October 2007
- Caetano Veloso: 25 October 2007
- Pilobolus: 29 October – 2 November 2007
- Beauty and the Beast: 7 – 25 November 2007
- MOMIX: 1 – 7 December 2007
- Woody Allen and his New Orleans Jazz Band: 28 – 29 December 2007

=== 2008 ===
- Budapest Gypsy Symphony Orchestra: 4 – 6 January 2008
- FUEGO!: 23 – 27 January 2008
- TABLÒ: 6 – 17 February 2008
- Michael Nyman: 4 March 2008
- Mamma Mia!: 6 May – 15 June 2008
- Polly Jean Harvey: 30 June 2008
- West Side Story 50th Anniversary World Tour: 10 – 29 September 2008
- Roger Hodgson - The Voice of Supertramp: 11 October 2008
- Tango Fire: 15 – 20 October 2008
- Kitaro - Love and Peace: 23 October 2008
- Carmen: 30 October – 2 November 2008
- Le Quatuor!: 12 – 16 November 2008
- National Theatre Prague Ballet's Solo for Three: 19-23 November 2008
- National Theatre Prague Ballet's Romeo and Juliet: 26-30 November 2008
- Cirque Éloize - Rain: 4 – 21 December 2008

=== 2009 ===
- Tiger Lillies Freakshow: 13 – 23 January 2009
- Edward Scissorhands (dance): 27 January – 8 February 2009
- Budapest Gypsy Symphony Orchestra: 13 – 18 February 2009
- Tindersticks: 21 February 2009
- Max Raabe & Palast Orchester: 24 March 2009
- Don Quichotte: 3 – 12 April 2009
- Nuevo Ballet Español: 5 – 10 May 2009
- Rhythm Of The Dance: 22 – 31 May 2009
- Tango Pasiοn: 9 – 14 June 2009
- Bertolt Brecht's Kurt Weill: 18 – 20 June 2009
- Antony & The Johnsons: 29 June 2009
- David Byrne: 6 July 2009
- Grupo Compay Segundo: 16 July 2009
- Archive: 11 September 2009
- Spaghetti Western Orchestra: 16–25 September 2009
- Kevin Costner & Modern West: 14 October 2009
- Singin' in the Rain: 21–25 October 2009
- Universal Ballet - Nutcracker: 24 November – 13 December 2009
- Chicago Mass Choir: 15 December 2009

=== 2010 ===
- Las Vegas Magic Festival: 5 – 17 January 2010
- Patricia Kaas: 6 February 2010
- St. Petersburg State Ice Ballet - The Sleeping Beauty: 3–21 March 2010
- Béjart Ballet - Lausanne: 27 – 28 March 2010
- Matthew Bourne's Swan Lake: 14 – 25 April 2010
- Evita: 11 – 30 May 2010
- Shen Yun Performing Arts: 3 – 4 June 2010
- Ana Moura: 14 – 20 June 2010
- Thriller – LIVE: 9 – 21 June 2010
- Barbara Mendes: 21 – 26 June 2010
- Nnena Freelon: 28 June – 3 July 2010
- Maria & Alba Serrano: 14 – 17 July 2010
- The Cherrt Orchard:1 – 3 October 2010
- Rasta Thomas - Rock The Ballet: 10 – 13 November 2010
- STOMP: 30 November – 5 December 2010

=== 2011 ===
- Eva Yerbabuena's Ballet Flamenco: 15 – 16 January 2011
- Bolero Chopiniana: 4 – 6 February 2011
- 2nd International Magic Festival: 9 – 20 February 2011
- Béjart Ballet - Lausanne's Ballet for Life: 25 – 28 February 2011
- Alice in Wonderland: 18 – 20 March 2011
- Forever Tango: 29 March – 3 April 2011
- Patito Feo: April 2011
- Ottmar Liebert & Luna Negra: 4 April 2011
- Los maestros del Tango: 13 – 14 May 2011
- Laurie Anderson's Delusion: 8 June 2011
- Shaolin Legend: 24 September 2011
- Spartacus: 19 – 21 October 2011
- The Cossacks of Russia: 28 – 30 October 2011
- Voca People: 4 – 6 November 2011
- Georgian National Ballet: 13 November 2011
- La Traviata: 17 – 18 November 2011
- Tango Por Dos: 19 – 20 November 2011
- Cinderella on Ice: 2 – 4 December 2011
- Don Quichotte: 9 – 11 December 2011
- Afrikania: 16 – 18 December 2011
- Nutcracker: 25 – 29 December 2011
- Dora the Explorer: 31 December 2011- 29 January 2012
- West End Stars in Concert: 20 – 23 December 2011

=== 2012 ===
- Harlem Swing's Ain't Misbehavin': 17 – 22 January 2012
- Bollywood Show: 23 January 2012
- 3rd World Magic Festival: 8 – 12 February 2012
- ΑΒΒΑmania: 17 – 18 February 2012
- Searching for Attik
- Tin City (By Eugenia Fakinou): 3, 4, 10, 11, 17, 18, 24, 25 & 31 March & 1 April 2012
- Manolis Rasoulis - Crack in time: 19 March 2012
- 1821 - Songs of the Revolutionary Greeks: 26 March 2012
- Actors singing Mikis Theodorakis: 27 March 2012
- A Tribute to Eptanisian Music: 2 April 2012
- Michael Soyoul - From the keys of Bandoneón to the strings of Bouzouki: 14 May 2012
- "Angela Papazoglou" with Anna Vagena: 20 May 2012
- Béjart Ballet Lausanne / BOLERO - DIONYSOS - SYNCOPE: 6–10 June 2012
- Euripides - Iphigenia at Aulis: Summer 2012
- Fuerza Bruta Look Up!: September 2012
- Sleeping Beauty - GRIGOROVICH BALLET THEATRE: 11–16 October 2012
- Ballet Flamenco de Andalucía: 3–4 November 2012
- At the Markets of Manos Hatzidakis: 9 November 2012
- Kostas Virvos - I do not live kneeling": 12 November 2012
- La Traviata - Stanislavsky Theatre: 22–24 November 2012
- Gustavo Russo - Tango Seduccion!: 28 November 2012
- The Wiener Johann Strauss Capelle: 1–2 December 2012
- Iakovos Kambanelis - Mauthausen: 6–9 December 2012
- Flying Superkids: 14–16 December 2012
- Splendid - China National Acrobatic Troupe: December 2012
- Mauthausen, a theatrical play based on the "Mauthausen Trilogy", premiered 6 December 2012
