= Goudi Olympic Complex =

Sports complex in Athens, Greece

Coordinates: 37.983826°N 23.780349°E

Goudi Olympic Complex is a sports complex in Athens, Greece. It held two of the sports venues used during the 2004 Summer Olympics. Goudi Olympic Complex was built upon a former Greek military camp. It was envisaged after the Olympics that it would be zoned as a municipal park.

== Goudi Olympic Hall ==
The Goudi Olympic Hall was a prefabricated venue with a capacity of 4,000 for the badminton. Following the Olympics, the Goudi Olympic Complex then became the site of the Badminton Theater, which hosted major theatrical productions.

In 2012, the Council of State ruled that the Theatre was illegally constructed and would have to be demolished. They ruled that though planning permission was granted, it was on the grounds that the Arena would be temporary. Though permission was granted in 2005 to make it permanent, the grant failed to consider the impact on the local community and was therefore void. This was despite the theatre company owners signing a 20-year lease and not taking any public subsidies to run profitably.

== Olympic Modern Pentathlon Centre ==
The Modern Pentathlon Centre was created as a venue for the modern pentathlon, and hosted the 2003 Modern Pentathlon World Cup. It included a 2,500 capacity swimming pool for the swimming discipline, a 5,000 capacity arena each for the show jumping and cross-country running disciplines and one 3,000 capacity arena for the shooting and fencing disciplines.

== Post-Olympics development ==
Following the Olympics, the Goudi Olympic Complex was mostly left dormant though the Government of Greece started to allocate land there for commercial development. In 2008, the mayor of Zografou Municipality accused the government of favouring commercial interests over benefit for the locals. As a result, this led to the complex being adapted for recreation purposes. Despite being used as the location of the theatre, the International Olympic Committee noted in a 2019 retrospective that the complex remained unused after the Olympics.
