= Tannoy =

British audio equipment manufacturer

- Industry: Audio Electronics and Speakers
- Founded: 1926, London, England
- Founder: Guy R. Fountain
- Headquarters: Manchester, England
- Area served: Worldwide
- Parent: Music Tribe
- Website: www.tannoy.com

Tannoy is a British manufacturer of loudspeakers and public address systems founded in 1926. Today the company is part of the Music Tribe group of brands.

== History ==
The company was founded by the Yorkshire-born engineer Guy Fountain (1898-1977) at a garage in Tulsemere Road, Dulwich in London as the Tulsemere Manufacturing Company. It originally made battery chargers for wireless radio sets. The company name was changed to Tannoy in 1928 and a small factory was opened in Dalton Road, West Norwood, later moving to Canterbury Grove. Tannoy Square SE27 commemorates the site today.

During World War II Tannoy public address systems were supplied to the armed forces, and a Tannoy PA system was used at Buckingham Palace in 1945 to announce the end of hostilities. Tannoy speakers were also supplied to factories around Britain to relay the BBC's motivational radio series Music While You Work, and to Butlins and Pontins holiday camps following the war - where they were famously used to waken guests with the words "Good morning, campers!". The Tannoy factory moved from Canterbury Grove to Coatbridge, Scotland in the 1970s.

In 2002, Tannoy was acquired by TC Group, and TC Group was subsequently acquired by Music Group in 2015. Following the Music Group acquisition, it was suggested that the Coatbridge facility would be closed and all related activities would be relocated to Manchester, England. In 2016, however, Music Group confirmed that Tannoy loudspeaker manufacturing would continue in Scotland, with a brand new manufacturing facility planned.

== Brand name ==
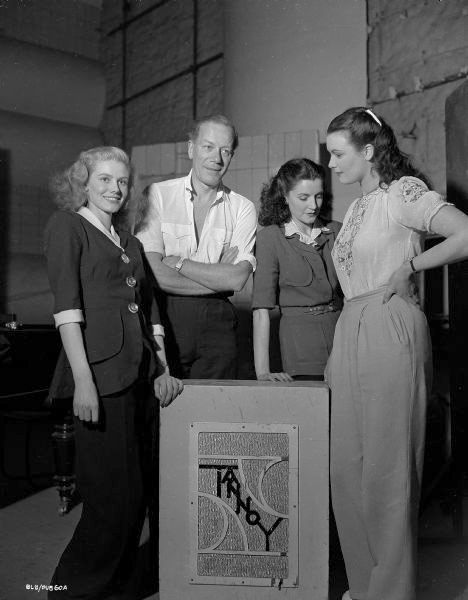
Actor Cyril Ritchard and three young women listen to the Tannoy public address system in 1948.

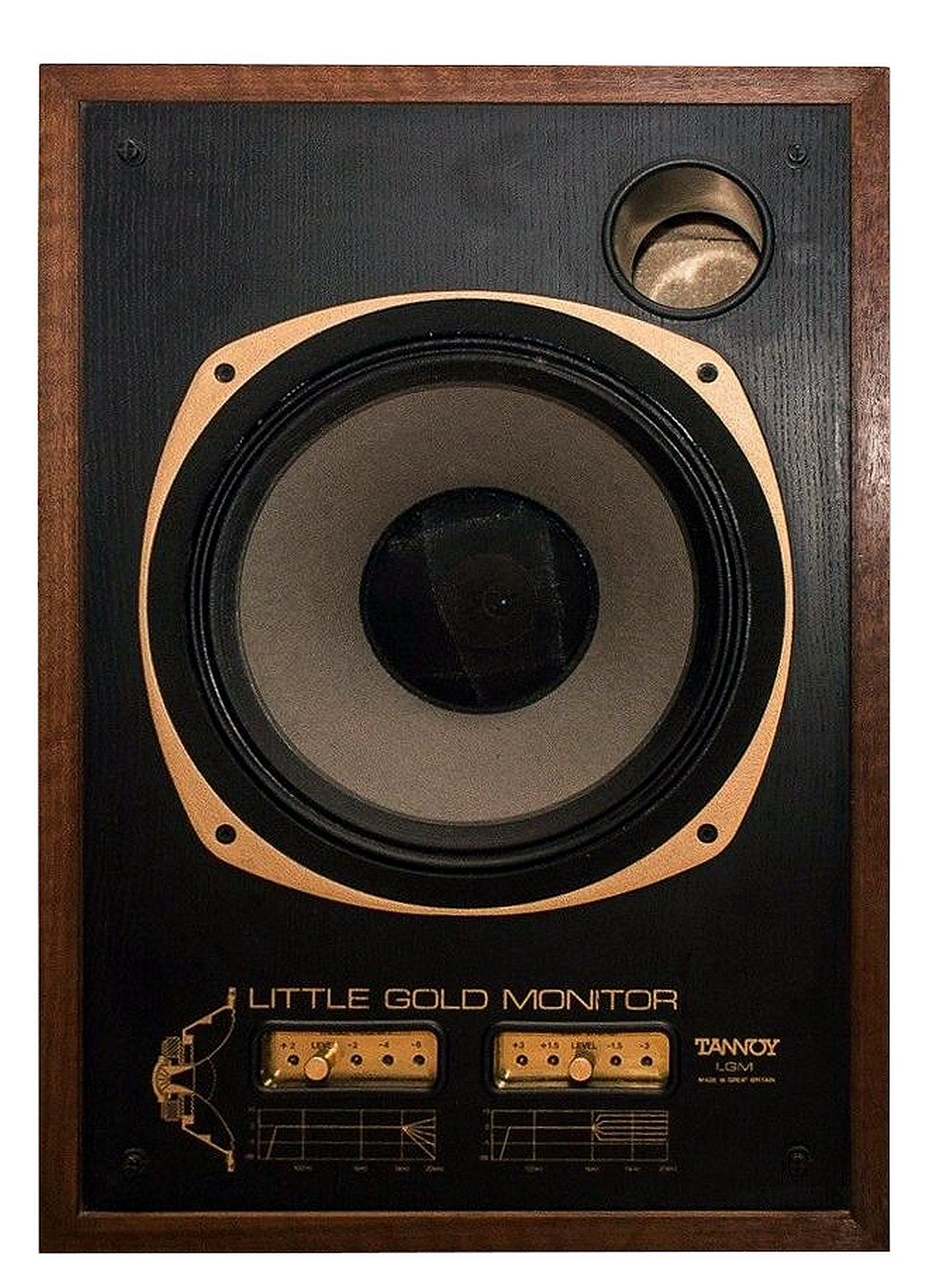
Professional studio monitor Little Gold Monitor (c. 1990) with two-way-coaxial construction, meaning the tweeter for frequencies from 1.400 Hz and above is located independently in the center of the 30 cm bass driver.

The name Tannoy is a syllabic abbreviation of tantalum alloy, which was the material used in a type of electrolytic rectifier developed by the company. The brand was trademarked by 10 March 1932, on which date the Tulsemere Manufacturing Company formally registered as Guy R. Fountain Limited.

Tannoy became a household name due to widespread and high profile adoption during and after the war, each speaker having the Tannoy logo prominently displayed on the speaker grills. As a result, the term "tannoy" came to be used in British English for any public-address system, and as a verb, to "tannoy", for making an announcement in a public place. That is, although Tannoy is a registered trademark, as of 2019, it is still often used generically. Because of this, the company's intellectual property department keeps a close eye on the media. To preserve its trademark, it often notifies publications not to use its trade name without a capital letter, or as a generic term for a PA system.

== Products ==
Tannoy's image is particularly linked to both studio monitors as well as its flagship Prestige range of home speakers. Prestige speakers use Dual Concentric cone speakers and are easily recognisable by their "vintage" design. Tannoy is notable for its 'Dual Concentric' speaker design, which places the tweeter behind the centre of the medium or bass driver. "Dual Concentric" is a trademark although Tannoy is not the only speaker manufacturer to design coaxial speakers.

Home and Studio speakers:

- Cheviot Series
- Reveal Series (Made in China)
- Plus Series
- 70Anniversary Series
- Surrey Series
- Gold Series
- Definition Series
- Eclipse Series
- Mercury Series
- Prestige Series
- Classic Monitor
- K3838 monitor kit (similar to Classic Monitor)
- Super Red Monitor
- K3808 monitor kit (similar to Super Red Monitor)
- Little Red
- Sixes Series
- Profile Series
- Precision Series
- Revolution Series
- Dimension Series
- Eyris Series
- Arena 5.1

Cabinets:

- Lancaster
- System DMT

PA Systems:

- Wildcats (1984)
- CPA Series (1990)
- T & I Series (1998)
- B Series (1998)
- V Series (2002)
- VS Series (2003)
- IQ Series (2004)
- VQ & VQNET Series (2009)
- VX & VXP Series (2011)
- VSX Series (2012)
- VSXNET (2015)

== See also ==
- List of studio monitor manufacturers
