= Klark Teknik =

Audio equipment company

- Industry: Professional audio
- Founded: 1974, Kidderminster, England
- Founder: Terence Clarke, Phillip Clarke
- Headquarters: Makati, Philippines
- Area served: Worldwide
- Parent: Music Tribe
- Website: klarkteknik.com

Klark Teknik is a company that designs and develops professional signal processing and audio equipment. Located in Kidderminster, Worcestershire, UK, the company was founded in 1974 by brothers Terence and Phillip Clarke. It developed a number of new types of equipment in the audio field, winning a Queen's Awards for Enterprise in 1986. It is now owned by Music Tribe.

== History ==
=== Precursors ===
In 1971, the brothers were running a company known as “Klark Equipment”, producing garage forecourt equipment: vending style vacuum cleaners, space heaters and other similar products.

Phillip was the entrepreneur having previously run a clothing business in Australia. Terry was the engineer: he had worked for Decca and was also an active local musician. With this background, the company soon branched into professional audio, at first upgrading and customising Decca multi-track tape recorders and later producing a very high quality ¼ inch 2-track tape machine of their own, the SM2. This tape machine was sold to the BBC and independent broadcasting companies under the brand name “Teknik”.

Terry also started to develop signal processing hardware including compressor/limiters and small graphic equalisers. These were produced in very low quantities and sold to (mostly local) recording studios to complement the relatively simple audio mixing console of the day. The graphic equalisers developed during 1973 onwards were called Teknik 7S and 9S, with seven and nine bands respectively, plus a stereo 11+11S with eleven bands of EQ.

=== Klark Teknik ===
In 1974 the brand name “Klark Teknik” came into being. 1976 saw the first KT product produced in real volume, the DN27 (later DN27A and previously DN27S). Approximately 6500 units shipped between 1977 and 1985.

In 1980 the company moved to its current purpose built premises at Walter Nash Road, Kidderminster. Up until this point the business had been run out of an old Nissen hut in a back corner of the Summerfield MOD solid fuel rocket motor factory with only 15 employees.

Klark Teknik PLC was formed in 1985. In the following year Klark Teknik acquired the Hounslow-based studio mixing company DDA and subsequently moved the manufacturing to Kidderminster. The company further diversified by developing active studio monitors under the brand “Klark Acoustic”, winning a Queen's Award for export. It also launched the DN772, a seven-second profanity delay with innovative time re-setting technology without pitch shifting artefacts, which featured in the BBC programme Tomorrow's World.

=== Subsequent mergers ===
Klark Teknik purchased Midas Audio Systems Ltd in 1987. In 1992, the Clarke brothers sold Klark Teknik Group to Mark IV Audio. Two years later, Terry Clarke went on to set up MC2 Audio Ltd with co-founder Ian McCarthy, producing high quality power amplifiers for the commercial market.

In 1998, Mark IV Audio sold their holdings of EVI Audio (owners of Klark Teknik) and Telex Communications to venture capitalists Greenwich Street Partners, who merged the companies into a single corporation called Telex Communications. On 1 September 2006, Greenwich sold Telex Communications to the Bosch Group. In December 2009, Midas and Klark Teknik were acquired by Music Group, a holding company chaired by Uli Behringer. The parent company has since been rebranded as Music Tribe.

== Products ==
Klark Teknik landmark products:

- DN27 Graphic equaliser (1976)
- DN36 Stereo Analogue Time Processor (1977)
- DN70 Digital Time Processor (1979)
- DN60 the world's first rackable spectrum analyser (1980)
- DN700 the first high-quality digital delay line (1983)
- DN360 dual graphic equaliser (1984)
- DN780 digital reverb unit (1985)
- DN1248 active microphone splitter (2000)
- DN9848 speaker processor (2000)
- Square ONE range (2005)
