= Midas Consoles =

Manufacturer of audio consoles

Midas
- Industry: Professional audio
- Founded: 1970, London, England
- Founder: Jeff Byers, Charles Brooke
- Headquarters: Manchester, England
- Area served: Worldwide
- Parent: Music Tribe
- Website: midasconsoles.com

Midas is a company that designs professional audio consoles. Founded in London in 1970 by Jeff Byers and Charles Brooke, today the company is part of the Music Tribe group of brands.

Midas consoles are used by audio engineers for live sound mixing. Applications for these consoles includes Front of House (FOH) and monitor console positions. Midas also markets the digital audio distribution components that are commonly used with their digital consoles as stand-alone digital snakes, or larger multi-site audio distribution networks.

== History ==
Originally founded in 1970 by Jeff Byers and Charles Brooke as Midas Amplification, a London manufacturer of solid state guitar amps, the company relocated near Euston Station in London, next door to Martin Audio, in 1972, and began producing the PR System modular mixer in 1974. Midas mixers were adopted by the tour sound market, and used by Clair Brothers Audio on the concert tours of Elvis Presley, Yes (band), Billy Joel, and The Beach Boys. Pink Floyd used Midas consoles on their Animals Tour in 1977 and The Wall Tour in 1979, and Frank Zappa used Midas consoles on his 1980 World Tour. Midas experienced success in the musical theatre market as well, with their consoles used for productions of Evita and Cats.

Midas launched the XL, the first of a series of large-format professional touring consoles, at the New York AES Convention in 1986. Development of the XL was costly, and in December 1987 the assets of Midas Audio Systems Ltd. were purchased by Klark Teknik. Under this new ownership, Midas released the XL2 in 1988, the XL3 in 1990, and the XL4 in 1995. The XL3 and XL4 established Midas as a leading live console manufacturer for the next two decades, and the XL series would grow to include the XL200, and XL250, as well as smaller models targeted at the club and regional sound market.

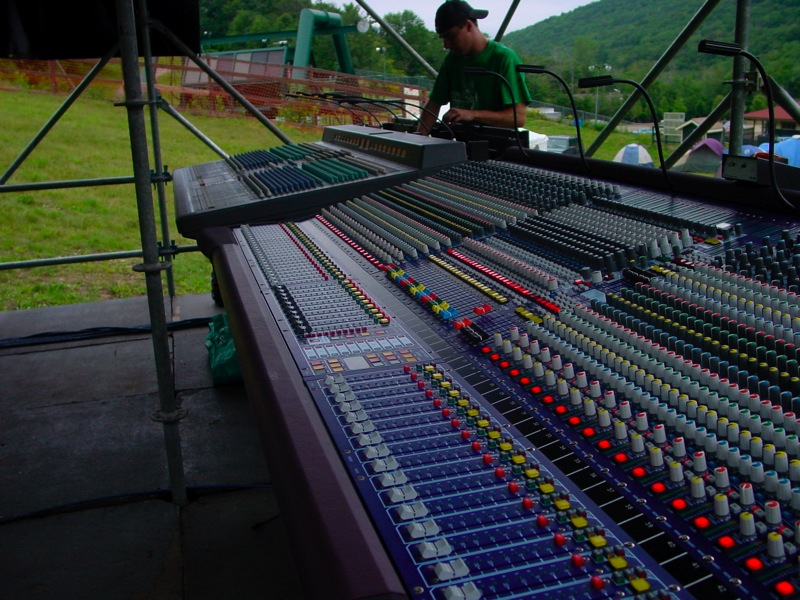
A Midas Heritage 3000 mixing console on the right at the Front of House position at an outdoor concert.

Beginning in 1998, Midas introduced the Heritage series consoles, including the H3000, H2000, H1000, and H4000.

Midas introduced their first digital console, the flagship XL8, at Musikmesse Frankfurt in 2006. Notable XL8 features included three preamps per channel to enable front of house, monitor and broadcast control surfaces to be fed from the same input rack, dual redundant master control processors, and integration with the Klark Teknik Helix EQ system via the Rapide remote. In September 2008 at the annual PLASA tradeshow, Midas introduced the PRO6 Live Audio System, the second networked digital audio system from Midas. Employing technologies developed from the XL8, the PRO6 offered similar audio performance in a more compact form factor.

In 2010, Midas introduced the PRO3 and PRO9 digital consoles, along with the VeniceF digital-analog hybrid ("Digi-Log") console, which replaced the Venice analog console. At the 2011 PLASA show, Midas unveiled the PRO2 and PRO2C consoles, which offered Midas digital features from the larger PRO and XL8 consoles in a more compact package and a lower price point. The following year at InfoComm, Midas introduced the PRO1 digital console, with an even smaller physical footprint and lower price point than the PRO2/PRO2C.

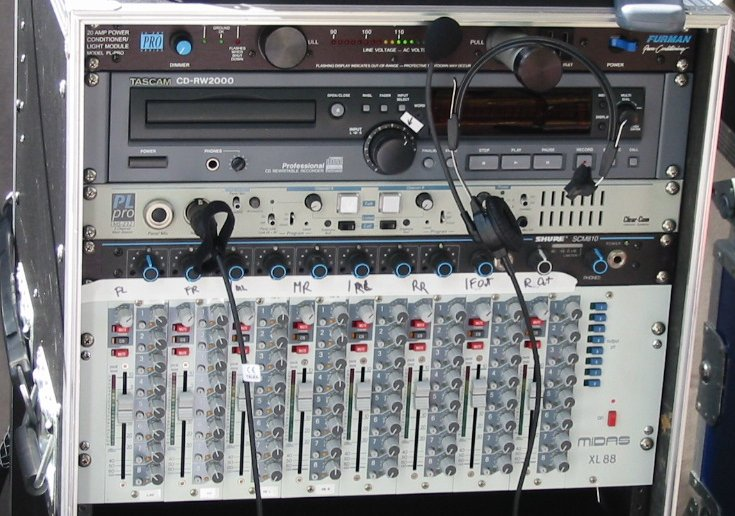
A 19-inch rack holding several professional audio devices including a Midas XL88 8×8 matrix mixer at the bottom

In January 2014 at the NAMM Show in Anaheim, California, Midas introduced the M32 ($4,999 MSRP in USA), based largely on parent company Music Tribe's highly-successful Behringer X32 mixer, sharing most of the X32's operating system, but utilizing Midas' Pro series microphone preamps. (X32 uses slightly different Midas-designed preamps, with Cirrus Logic A/D converters and a sample rate of 48 kHz. Midas Pro preamps are 96 kHz and use Midas' own MIDAS-8000 8-channel A/D converter, which reportedly has better performance numbers than Cirrus Logic chips used by most other console makers).

At that same time, Midas began retiring much of its analog console product line, including the Heritage, Legend, and Siena series, while maintaining the Verona analog console and VeniceF and VeniceU analog-digital hybrid versions of the original Venice console an active part of Midas' product line.

Linux is used at the core of all Midas digital consoles. This is mentioned prominently in their marketing materials, as well as in their preference for Linux development and kernel programming experience in job postings for development positions. At the core of all Midas Pro desks is standard PC motherboard with 4GB flash card (for OS and data storage).

Midas became part of the Telex Group, which was subsequently acquired by the Bosch Group in January 2006. In December 2009, Midas and Klark Teknik were acquired by Music Group, a holding company chaired by Uli Behringer. Music Group was later rebranded as Music Tribe.
