= Midas XL8 =

The Midas XL8 was the first digital mixing console produced by Midas, previously a leading manufacturer of analogue mixing consoles for live sound. The introduction of the console came after years of digital console competition by Yamaha, Digidesign, and DiGiCo.
