= Lab Gruppen =

Swedish sound equipment company

- Industry: Audio Electronics and Amplifiers
- Founded: 1979, Kungsbacka, Sweden
- Founder: Kenneth Andersson, Dan Bävholm
- Headquarters: Makati, Philippines
- Area served: Worldwide
- Parent: Music Tribe
- Website: labgruppen.com

Lab Gruppen (stylized as Lab.Gruppen) is a Swedish sound equipment company, based in Kungsbacka, Sweden, dedicated to building mainly public address power amplifiers. Lab Gruppen is part of the Music Tribe group of brands. As of 2007, the company had 130 employees.

== History ==
Kenneth Andersson and Dan Bävholm founded Lab.gruppen in 1979. They first met as schoolboys when they shared an interest in electronics.

Andersson and Bävholm's first project was a hand-made mixing console. It was used as part of the front of house equipment for a concert by Eartha Kitt. They created other mixers and a series of guitar heads and combos. Their intermittent manufacture of mixers and guitar amplifiers continued through the formal establishment of Lab.gruppen in 1979. The company was located inside a local hi-fi store, where the duo serviced consumer equipment for additional income. It was here that the company's first professional audio power amplifier was created.

Between the LAB 4000 and fP Series 6400, Lab.gruppen engineers continued to advance and refine their products. The LAB Series was overhauled and augmented and subsequently became the fP range. fP designs were upgraded to meet the stringent new EMC standards in Europe, and adoption of UL safety standards allowed them to be sold in the United States. Standardization of internal components between models increased manufacturing efficiency to keep pricing competitive in all new markets.

In the late 1990s, the founders brought in new ownership and a managing director. In July 2000, Lab.gruppen was acquired by the TGI Group of the United Kingdom, and a few months later Tomas Lilja was chosen as managing director. In early 2002, the TGI Group was acquired by TC Group of Denmark, the current corporate owner. In 2004, the company moved to its new location at Faktorvägen. Both Andersson and Bävholm remained with the company following the acquisitions.

In 1998, Lab.gruppen engineers undertook the long-term development of a new amplifier platform. The complete range would have four bridgeable amplifier channels and an integrated monitoring and control network. The basic technology of both the power supply and output stages was taken from the proven fP range, but with significant upgrades to reduce the number of components required. Designated the C Series and targeted at the installation market, the first amplifiers of this design were shipped in the summer of 2005. This was followed up by the release of FP+ in 2006 and PLM Series in 2007.

The PLM Series was the first Lake processor with integrated amplification and it as it was embraced by the market. Lab.gruppen acquired the exclusive rights to the Lake brand and the Lake processing for professional applications in touring and fixed installations 2009.

The E Series was the first amplifier range with more than 200 W per channel that got the Energy Star approval when it was launched in 2011. More amplifiers with Energy Star were added with the LUCIA models in 2013. In 2014, Lab.gruppen launched D Series for installations with audio over the network and PLM+, a successor to PLM Series.

In 2015, Lab.gruppen and the other brands of TC Group were acquired by Music Group.

In 2016, Lab.gruppen expanded the E and LUCIA product lines so that there are now 15 models with Energy Star. In 2019, Lab.gruppen introduced the CA Series of amplifiers designed for commercial applications.

In 2022, Lab.gruppen announced that it would cease manufacturing in Sweden, instead relying on production facilities in Thailand, China, and Malaysia.

== Product models ==
- PLM+ Series
- FP+ Series
- IPD Series
- IPX Series
- D Series
- C Series
- E Series
- LUCIA Series

=== Powered Loudspeaker Management Systems ===
- PLM 20K44
- PLM 12K44
- PLM 8K44
- PLM 5K44

The Powered Loudspeaker Manager system integrates the functions of crossover, delay, equalization, limiting, Dante audio networking, and power amplification. It combines signal processing from Lake and Lake Controller networked control and power amplification from Lab.gruppen.

=== Power Amplifiers ===
- FP+ 14.000 (2x7000w 2ohm, 2x4400w 4ohm, 2x2350w 8ohm, 2x1200w 16ohm, bridge 14.000w 4ohm, 8800w 8ohm, 4700w 16ohm)
- FP+ 10.000Q (4x2500w 2ohm, 4x2100w 4ohm, 4x1300w 8ohm, 4x660w 16ohm, bridge 2x5000w 4ohm, 2x4200w 8ohm, 2x2600w 16ohm)
- FP+ 7000 (2x3500w 2ohm, 2x2800w 4ohm, 2x1450w 8ohm, 2x730w 16ohm, bridge 7000w 4ohm, 5600w 8ohm, 2900w 16ohm)

- C 88:4
- C 68:4
- C 48:4
- C 28:4
- C 16:4
- C 20:8X
- C 10:4X
- C 10:8X
- C 5:4X

- E 12:2 (2x600w 2ohm, 2x600w 4ohm, 2x600w 8ohm, 2x600w 70V)
- E 8:2 (2x400w 2ohm, 2x400w 4ohm, 2x400w 8ohm, 2x400w 70V)
- E 4:2 (2x200w 2ohm, 2x200w 4ohm, 2x200w 8ohm, 2x200w 70V)
- E 2:2 (2x100w 4ohm, 2x100w 8ohm, 2x100w 70V)
- E 10:4 (4x250w 4ohm, 4x250w 8ohm, 4x250w 70V)
- E 5:4 (4x125w 4ohm, 4x125w 8ohm, 4x125w 70V)

=== Discontinued Power Amplifiers ===
- PLM 20.000Q (2x4800w 2ohm, 2x4400w 4ohm, 2x2300w 8ohm, 2x1150w 16ohm, bridge 9600w 4ohm, 8800w 8ohm)
- PLM 14.000 (2x7000w 2ohm, 2x4300w 4ohm, 2x2300w 8ohm, 2x1150w 16ohm, bridge 14.000w 4ohm, 8600w 8ohm, 4600w 16ohm)
- PLM 10.000Q (4x2350w 2ohm, 4x2300w 4ohm, 4x1300w 8ohm, 4x660w 16ohm, bridge 2x4700w 4ohm, 2x4600w 8ohm)

- FP+ 6000Q (4x1500w 2ohm, 4x1250w 4ohm, 4x625w 8ohm, 4x320w 16ohm, bridge 2x3000w 4ohm, 2x2500w 8ohm, 2x1250w 16ohm)
- FP+ 13.000 (2x6500w 2ohm, 2x4300w 4ohm, 2x2350w 8ohm, 2x1200w 16ohm, bridge 14.000w 4ohm, 8800w 8ohm, 4700w 16ohm)
- FP+ 9000 (2x4500w 2ohm, 2x3000w 4ohm, 2x1600w 8ohm, 2x800w 16ohm, bridge 9000w 4ohm, 6000w 8ohm, 3200w 16ohm)
- FP+ 4000 (2x2000w 2ohm, 2x1600w 4ohm, 2x800w 8ohm, 2x400w 16ohm, bridge 4000w 4ohm, 3200w 8ohm, 1600w 16ohm)

- fP 6400 (2x3200w 2ohm, 2x2300w 4ohm, 2x1300w 8ohm, 2x 650w 16ohm, bridge 1x5000w 4ohm, 1x4400w 8ohm, 1x2500w 16ohm)
- fP 3400 (2x1700w 2ohm, 2x1500w 4ohm, 2x1100w 8ohm, bridge 1x3400w 4ohm)
- fP 2600 (2x430W 8ohm, 2x840W 4ohm, 2x1540W 2ohm, Bridge 1x1680W 8ohm, 1x3080W 4ohm)

- LAB 1000 (2x380W 8ohm, 2x600W 4ohm, 2x700W 2ohm / Bridge 1100W 8ohm, 1350W 4ohm)
- LAB 1300C (2x350W 8ohm, 2x650W 4ohm, 2x900W 2ohm / Bridge 1300W 8ohm, 1800W 4ohm)
- LAB 1600 (2x410W 8ohm, 2x800W 4ohm, 2x870W 2ohm / Bridge 1680W 8ohm, 3080W 4ohm)
- LAB 2002 (2x1100W 8ohm, 2x1400W 4ohm, 2x1400W 2ohm / Bridge 2800W 8ohm, 1800W 4ohm)
- LAB 2000C (2x1100w 8ohm, 2x1500w 4ohm, 2x1700w 2ohm / bridge 3400w 4ohm)

- SS 1300 (2x325w 8ohm, 2x600w 4ohm, 2x700 2ohm / bridge 1300w 8ohm, 1700w 4ohm)
- SS 1500 (2x800w 8ohm, 2x1150w 4ohm / bridge 2300w 8ohm)

=== Other ===
- DSP 24: 2-in/4-out digital crossover and loudspeaker equalization unit. Can be controlled from a Windows environment through VIEW (a Lab.gruppen control software program).
- ACN 2B: 2 way crossover
