= Music Tribe =

Company based in Manila, Philippines

- Company type: Private
- Industry: Audio and music products
- Founded: 1989
- Founder: Uli Behringer
- Headquarters: Makati, Metro Manila, Philippines
- Key people: Uli Behringer, Founder and CEO
- Website: https://www.musictribe.com

Music Tribe, formerly Music Group, is a holding company based in the City of Makati, Metro Manila, Philippines. It is chaired by Uli Behringer, founder of Behringer. Music Tribe's portfolio includes Behringer, Cool Audio, Midas, Turbosound, TC Electronic and TC-Helicon, Tannoy, Klark Teknik, Lab.gruppen, and Aston Microphones.

== History ==
In December 2009, Music Group acquired Midas and Klark Teknik from Bosch Communications Systems (formerly Telex Communications) of Bosch Group. In 2012, Music Group acquired Turbosound, a UK-based loudspeaker manufacturer. In April 2015, Music Group acquired TC Group. In December 2017, Music Group rebranded to Music Tribe.

== Factory complex ==
In 2018, the company completed a new manufacturing complex in Zhongshan, China moving in from their old complex in the same province. The new complex contains factory buildings and dormitories for up to 10.000 workers. It opened with 3,000 employees.

== Brands ==
- Aston Microphones
- Behringer
- Bugera
- Coolaudio
- Klark Teknik
- Lab.gruppen
- Lake
- Midas
- Tannoy
- TC Electronic
- TC-Helicon
- Turbosound
