= Behringer =

Audio equipment manufacturer

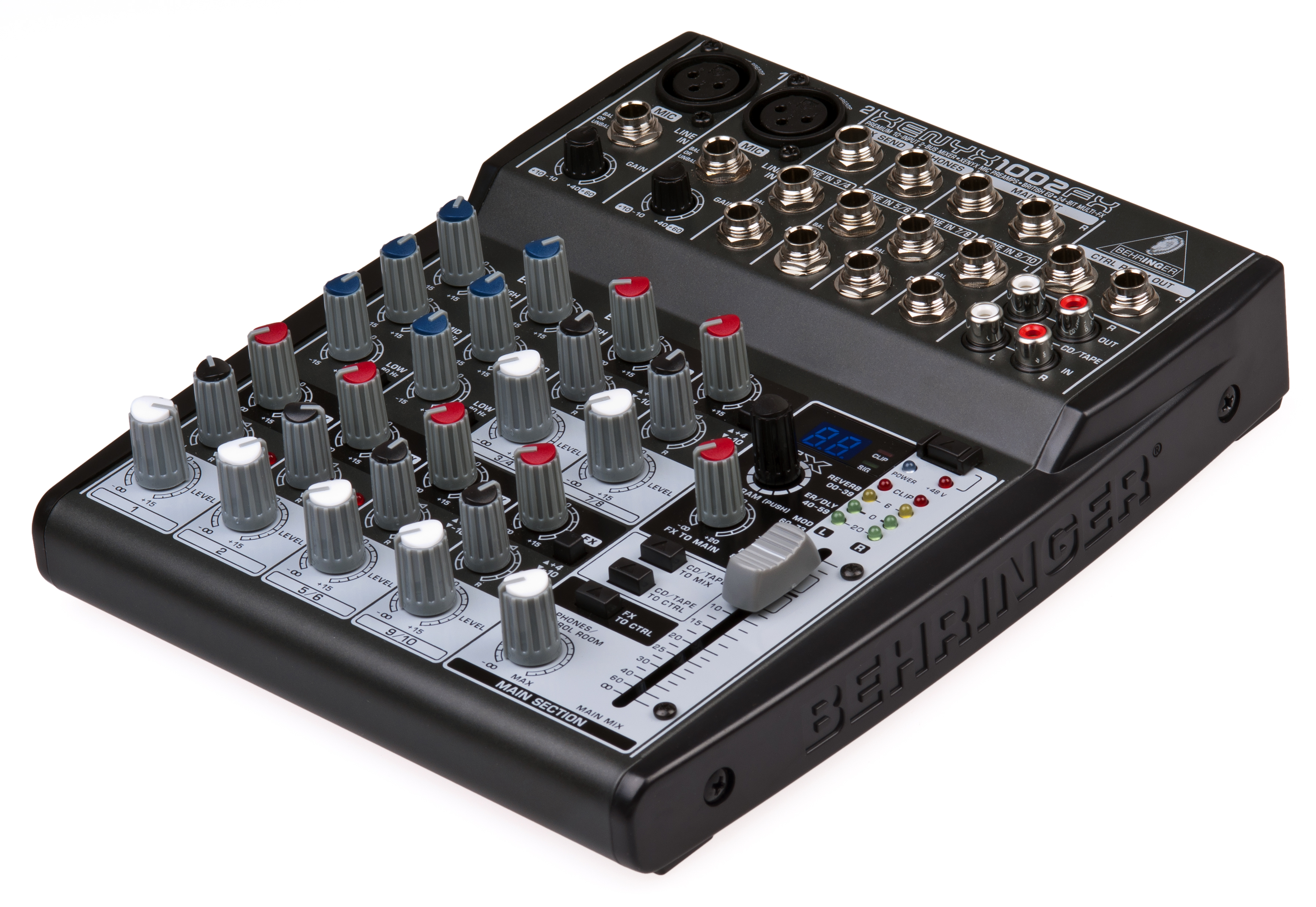
- Type: Private
- Genre: Audio equipment
- Founded: 25 January 1989; 37 years ago in Germany
- Headquarters: Willich, Germany
- Key people: Uli Behringer (Founder and CEO)
- Products: Audio and lighting equipment, musical instruments
- Number of employees: 3,500
- Parent: Music Tribe
- Website: www.behringer.com

Behringer is an audio equipment company founded by the Swiss engineer Uli Behringer on 25 January 1989 in Willich, Germany. Behringer produces equipment including synthesizers, mixers, audio interfaces and amplifiers. Behringer is owned by Music Tribe (formerly Music Group), a holding company chaired by Uli Behringer.

== History ==
=== Foundation and early development ===
Uli Behringer was born on 14 April 1961 in Baden, Switzerland. His father was a church organist and nuclear physicist; his mother a pianist and interpreter; his uncle a professor of composition at the Richard Strauss Conservatory in Munich; and his aunt a classical singer and pianist. At the age of four, Uli Behringer started to learn piano. When Behringer was five years old, his father acquired the organ from a church being demolished. He then helped his father integrate the organ with over 1000 pipes into the family home. At the age of 16, he built his first synthesizer, the UB1.

=== Marketing, manufacturing, and acquisitions ===
While Behringer products were manufactured in Willich, Germany, many of the individual components were imported from mainland China. In 1990, to lower production costs, Behringer shifted production from West Germany to mainland China. Initially, subcontractors were engaged to produce the equipment. By 1997 Uli Behringer had relocated to Hong Kong to better supervise manufacturing quality.

==== CoolAudio acquisition ====
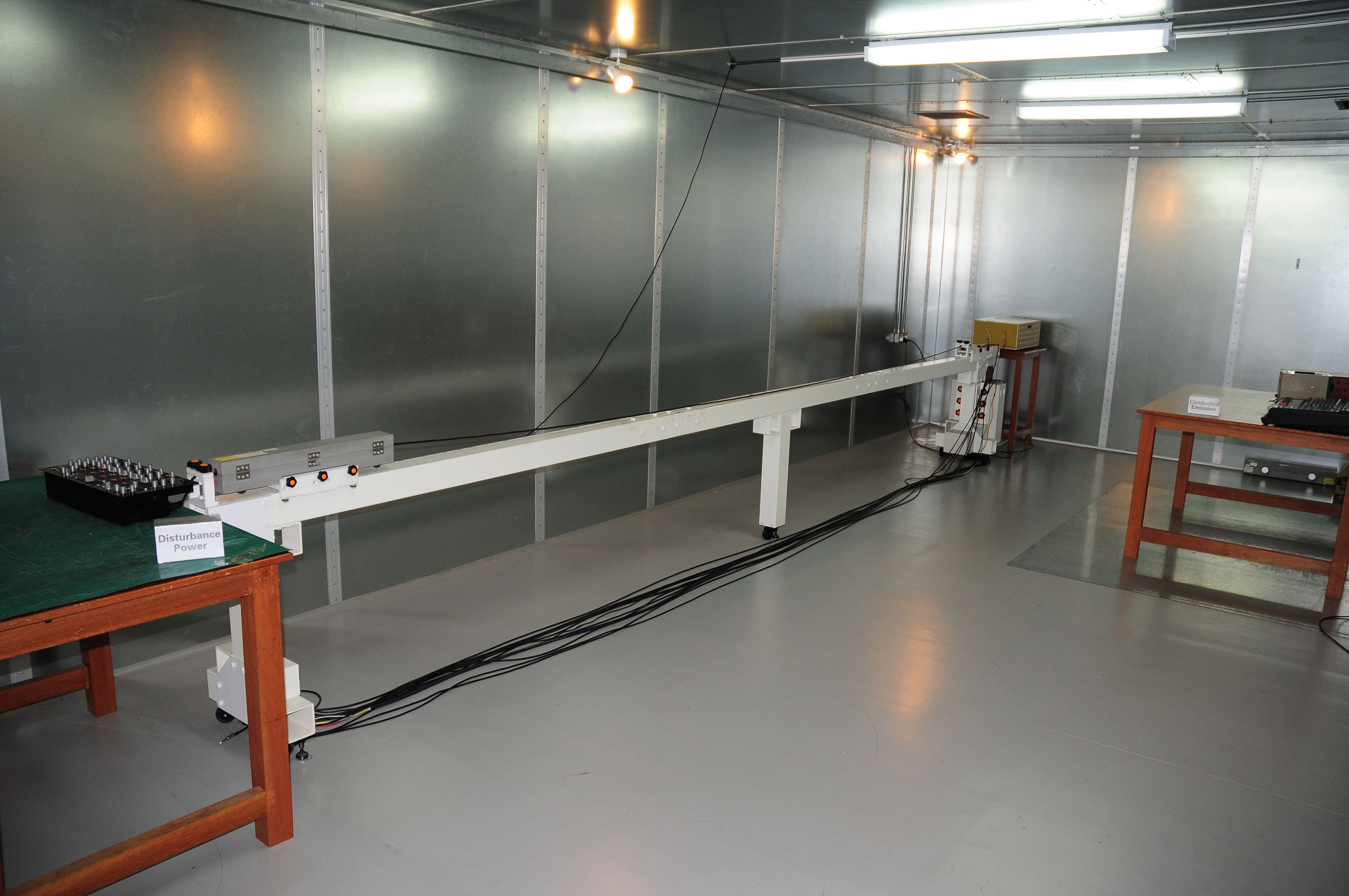
The certified EMC testing facility in Behringer City

In May 2000, Behringer acquired the rights to the entire CoolAudio technology from Intersil Corporation, a US-based semi-conductor manufacturer specializing in integrated circuits for audio applications. The acquisition included an intellectual property portfolio and licensees such as Alpine and Rowe, among others.

==== Music Tribe City ====
In 2018, Music Tribe opened its own factory, Music Tribe City, in Zhongshan, Guangdong, China. The factory handles the production and distribution for Music Tribe's 12 brands, including Behringer products.

== Products ==
Behringer makes products for audio engineering, producing, audio playback, effect processors, and electronic instruments. Additionally, Behringer digital mixers are compatible with third-party remote mixing platforms, including cloud-based control systems.

=== Effect units ===
Outside of their sub-company TC Electronic, Behringer has released guitar pedals based on famous circuits. Their main pedals are designed to be similar in design to BOSS. In 2019, JHS Pedals made a YouTube video comparing the basic pedal range to their inspirations. The video reportedly caused Uli Behringer to lose sleep as he was confused on "why a pedal company would tell you to buy other people's stuff". In more recent dates, Behringer has been taking a similar approach to the company Warm Audio with recreating vintage pedals to be as visually close to their original, such as with the Chorus Symphony (clone of a BOSS CE-1), the Centaur Overdrive (Klon Centaur), and the B-Tron III (Mu-Tron III).

=== Electronic instruments ===
Since 2016, Behringer has become a manufacturer of synthesizers and drum machines, which includes original models and recreations of analog hardware. Manufacturers (such as Curtis Electromusic, Roger Linn, and Tom Oberheim) have been vocal about being unhappy with their products being cloned without asking for permission. Behringer has said in response that creating clones of older hardware is legal where the patents have expired.

==== List of synthesizers and eurorack modules ====
===== Originals =====
- Neutron (2018–present)
- Crave (2019–present)
- Space FX (2022–present)
- Grind (2024–present)
- Phara-O Mini (2024–present)
- PROTON (2024–present)

===== Clones/replicas/recreations =====
- 1000 series (clones of the ARP 2500)
- 2-XM (Oberheim SEM)
- 2600 (Arp 2600)
- Abacus (Make Noise Maths)
- Brains (Mutable Instruments Plaits)
- BX-1 (Yamaha DX1)
- Cat (Octave Electronics The Cat)
- Chaos (Mutable Instruments Marbles)
- Deepmind 6/12 (Roland Juno-106)
- Four Play (Intellijel Quad VCA)
- JT-4000M Micro (Roland JP-8000)
- JT-Mini/JT-16 (Roland Jupiter-8)
- K-2 / K-2 MK II (Korg MS-20)
- Kobol Expander (RSF Kobol Expander)
- Model 15 (Moog Grandmother)
- Model D/Poly D (Minimoog)
- MonoPoly (Korg Monopoly)
- MS-101/MS-1 (Roland SH-101)
- MS-5 (Roland SH-5)
- Odyssey (ARP Odyssey)
- PRO-1 (Sequential Pro-One)
- Pro-16 (Sequential Prophet-5)
- PRO-800 (Sequential Prophet 600)
- Pro VS Mini/Victor (Sequential Prophet VS)
- Solina String Ensemble (Solina String Ensemble)
- Spice (Moog Subharmonicon)
- Surges (Mutable Instruments Ripples)
- Syncussion SY-1 (Pearl SY1 Syncussion)
- System 15/35/55 (Moog synthesizer)
- System 100 (Roland System-100M)
- TD-3 (Roland TB-303)
- Toro (Moog Taurus)
- UB-Xa/UB-Xa D (Oberheim OB-Xa)
- Vocoder VC340 (Roland VP330)
- Wasp Deluxe (Electronic Dream Plant EDP Wasp)
- Wave (PPG Wave)
- Waves (Mutable Instruments Tides)
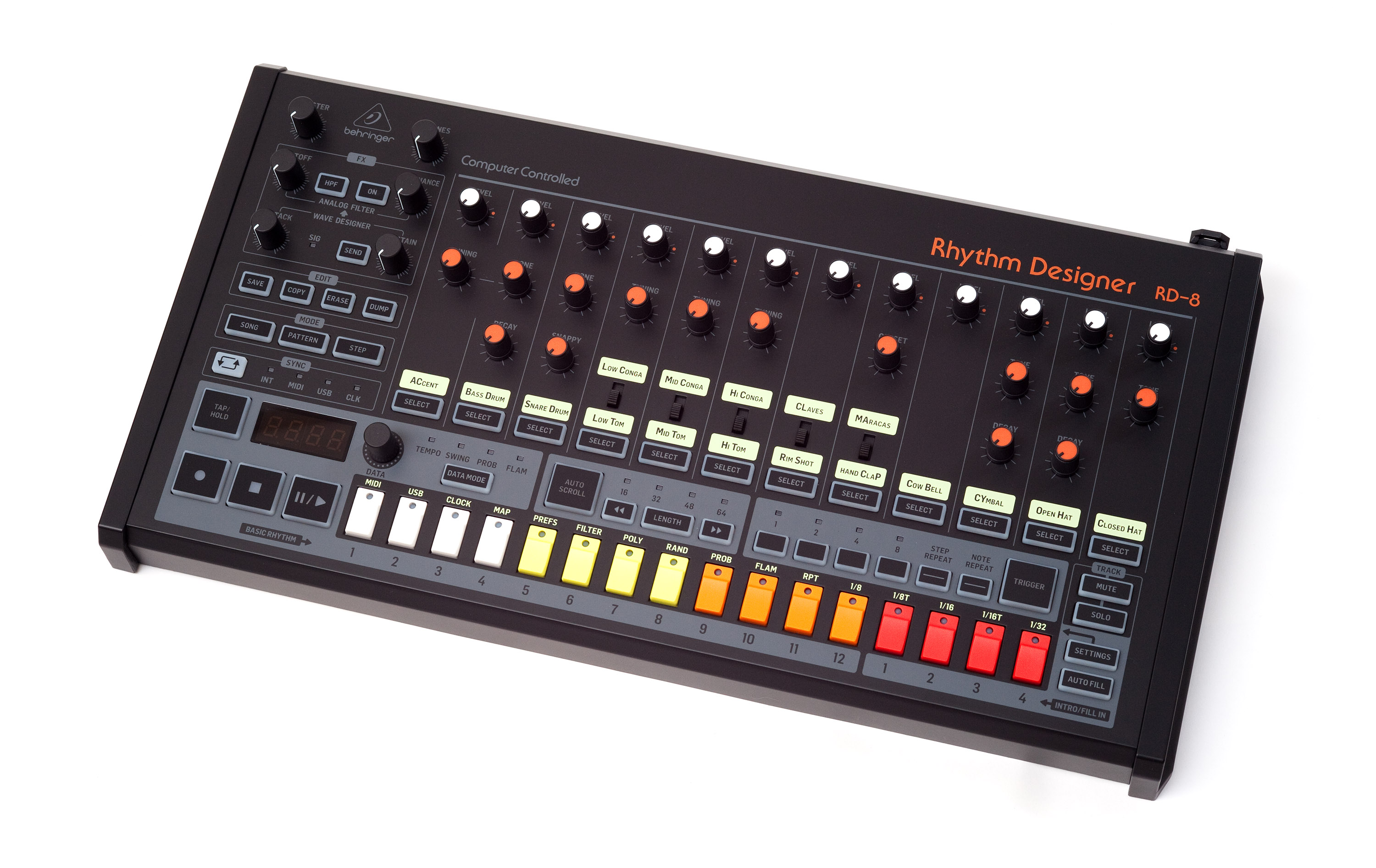

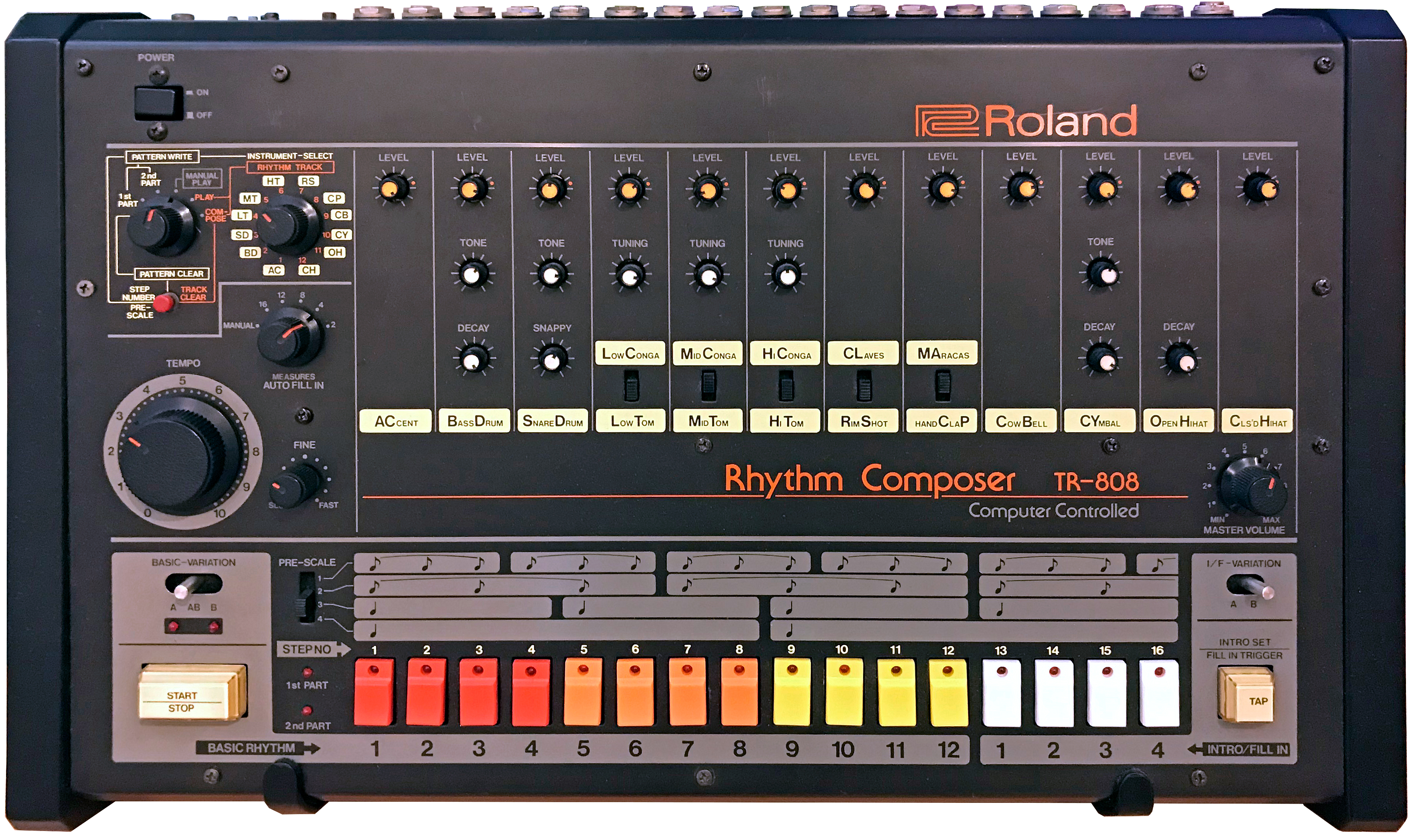
The Behringer RD-8 drum machine (top) is based on the Roland TR-808 drum machine (bottom).

==== List of drum machines, drum synthesizers clones ====
- Edge (Moog DFAM)
- LM Drum (LinnDrum)
- RD-6 (Roland TR-606)
- RD-8 (Roland TR-808)
- RD-9 (Roland TR-909)
- RD-78 (Roland CR-78)

===== Virtual Digital Plugin Synths =====
- Vintage (Free)

== Controversies ==
=== Legal developments ===
==== FCC dispute ====
In February 2006, the US Federal Communications Commission (FCC) fined Behringer $1M. The FCC issued a Notice of Apparent Liability claiming that 50 products had not been tested for conducted and radiated emissions limits as required by US law, and noted that it continued to sell the products for a year after being notified. Behringer's position was that, since the units had passed stringent European CE standards, they would also comply with FCC verification requirements. According to Behringer, it had overlooked the differences in testing standards and procedures under FCC and European requirements. It has since implemented a complete UL certified safety and EMC testing laboratory under the UL Certified Witness Program, including in-house audits and global regulatory review systems.

==== Legal cases ====
In June 1997, the Mackie company (now LOUD Technologies) accused Behringer of trademark and trade dress infringement, and brought suit seeking $327M in damages. The claims were later rejected by the court. In their suit, Mackie said that Behringer had had a history of copying products by other manufacturers and selling them as their own. The Mackie suit detailed an instance, in which Behringer was sued by Aphex Systems for copying the Aural Exciter Type F. In that case Aphex Systems won DM690,000. The Mackie suit also mentioned similar cases filed by BBE, dbx and Drawmer. On 30 November 1999, the U.S. District Court in Seattle, Washington, dismissed Mackie claims that Behringer had infringed on Mackie copyrights with its MX 8000 mixer, noting that circuit schematics are not covered by copyright laws.

In 2005, Roland Corporation sued to enforce Roland's trade dress, trademark, and other intellectual property rights with regard to Behringer's recently released guitar pedals. The companies came to a confidential settlement in 2006 after Behringer changed their designs.

In 2009, Peavey Electronics Corporation filed two lawsuits against various companies under the Behringer/Music Group umbrella for patent infringement, federal and common law trademark infringement, false designation of origin, trademark dilution and unfair competition. In 2011 the Music Group filed a countersuit against Peavey for "false advertising, false patent marking and unfair competition."

In 2017, Music Group filed a defamation lawsuit against Dave Smith Instruments, a Dave Smith Instruments engineer, and 20 Gearslutz forum users. The case was dismissed as a SLAPP lawsuit.

==== Fictional synthesizer advertisement ====
In March 2020, Behringer published a mock video for a synthesizer, the "KIRN CorkSniffer", which appeared to mock the music technology journalist and synthesizer developer Peter Kirn. The video received criticism and accusations of using antisemitic imagery. Uli Behringer issued a response on Facebook, saying the video had been intended as "pure satire by our marketing department". The apology was deleted the following day.

== See also ==
- List of microphone manufacturers
- List of studio monitor manufacturers
- Synthesizer clone
