= History of keyboard instruments =

The history of keyboard instruments lies in mechanical musical instrument keyboards, electrified keyboards and 1960s and 1970s synthesizer technologies.

== Mechanical keyboard instruments ==
Keyboard instruments can be found as far back as the hydraulis (a water organ) in the 3rd century BCE, which developed into the pipe organ, and small portable instruments such as the portative and positive organ. Additional keyboard instruments, the clavichord (tangent-struck strings) and harpsichord (quill-plucked strings), were developed in the 14th century CE. As technology improved, more sophisticated keyboards were developed, including the 12-tone keyboard still in use today. Initially, the keyboard of an instrument such as a pipe organ or harpsichord could only produce sounds of one particular volume. In the 18th century, the pianoforte was invented. The pianoforte had metal strings which were struck by hammers which were activated by pressing or striking the keys. Depending on whether the keys were pressed lightly or forcefully, the pianoforte would produce a softer or louder sound.

== Early electrified keyboards ==
The next step towards creating electric keyboards was to apply electric sound technology. The first electric musical instrument of any type was the Denis d'or stringed instrument, which was built by Václav Prokop Diviš in 1748. It had 700 strings temporarily electrified to enhance their sonic qualities. In 1760, Jean Baptiste Thillaie de Laborde developed the clavecin électrique. This was a keyboard instrument played with plectra and activated by electricity, but neither instrument used electricity to produce sound. In 1874, Elisha Gray invented an electric musical instrument called the musical telegraph. It made sound from an electromagnetic circuit's vibration. He later incorporated a basic single note oscillator and a loudspeaker consisting of diaphragm to make these notes audible.

== Electric keyboards and synthesizers ==
In 1906, Lee de Forest invented the triode electronic valve. In 1915 he invented the first vacuum tube instrument, the audio piano. Until the invention of the transistor, the vacuum tube was an essential component in electric instruments. In 1935, the Hammond organ was introduced, exploiting previous limited production efforts like the Robb Wave Organ from 1923. It was capable of producing polyphonic sounds by virtue of a spinning shaft with many magnetic 'lobes' which would cycle past an electromagnetic pickup at a rate that would produce each desired tone. The Hammond organ was connected to a power amplifier and a speaker cabinet. In 1929, the electric piano was invented. In 1939, Hammond introduced the Novachord which used about 170 vacuum tubes, coils, capacitors and resistors largely to create an upper octave of notes and then divide them in half using 'flip flop' circuits to create successively lower octaves from each note. The instrument also has many features like envelopes for filter and amplifiers so that sounds can be contoured at the user's discretion, making it the first production analog synthesizer.

In 1941, Georges Jenny's previously prototyped Ondioline became the first truly portable synthesizer keyboard (the Novachord weighed over 500 pounds (230 kg)). More developments were made with the Chamberlin Music Maker in late 1940s and the Mellotron in the early 1950s, which employed mechanisms to play back recordings at speeds that would produce the desired tone for the key being struck. Other technologies improved on this idea over the years. Machines like the Optigan used photo-emulsion to create disks that had images whose density would convert to waveforms when spun in front of a beam/sensor assembly. In 1981 the E-mu Emulator was marketed to digitally store samples and play them back.

The first step towards the electric piano was by Harold Rhodes who developed various prototypes using parts from B-17 aircraft that were being scrapped. He received a medal since the resulting keyboard was used as therapy for people rehabilitating from injuries from WW2. (It is small enough to set on a stand over a patient's bed in a hospital, looking something like a miniature grand piano in shape.) Instructions were made and people built this "pre-piano" which amplifies the signals generated in a pickup from the vibration of stainless steel rods tapered near the steel base they are driven into holes in. Piano type wooden hammers are used to strike them. It was a three octave (E to F for 38 notes) instrument. A tube amplifier drove a speaker pointing out the bottom.

In 1955, the Wurlitzer Company released the company's first electric piano, the model 100. The Wurlitzer strikes flat tines whose vibration is amplified from a surrounding electrostatic charged 'comb'. In '59 the Fender company bought the Rhodes name and produced the piano bass and then in the mid-'60s began producing the famous Fender Rhodes series which used rod shaped tines mounted on a steel piece that runs parallel above them, with a coil pickup on each individual tine. The invention of the transistor in 1959 spawned the production of progressively more compact keyboards. Many home organs maintained the appearance but lost some weight due to the lower power consumption needs of transistor circuitry. Also in this era 'combo organs' found a lot of use like the famous Vox Continental used by the Beatles and others, the Gibson G101 used by The Doors, and other organs by Farfisa, Wurlitzer, Acetone (Roland) and others. These were usually built using 12 oscillators and transistor pair 'divider' circuits to produce all the frequencies like all non- 'tone wheel' electronic organs of the era. They were just more compact and thus suited for 'combo' use.

== Synthesizers ==
The exploration of musical synthesizers in the 1960s was a step towards the modern keyboard. As technology became more developed, huge synthesizers evolved into portable instruments that could be used in live shows. The rapid accumulation of momentum began in 1964 when Bob Moog produced his Moog synthesizer. It used a remote keyboard and was 'modular' in design. (i.e. it was a rack that held boxes which each had a function. At least one was to create a tone controlled in pitch by a voltage input, and usually a host of other modules including filters, amplifiers, envelope generators, etc.) His next generation was equipped with a built-in keyboard in 1970: the Mini-Moog. These keyboards were monophonic, along with semi-modulars like the ARP 2600, and were only able to respond to one note at a time (though three oscillators could be layered together in response to the 'control voltage' produced by that note).

In 1972, instruments such as the EML 101, ARP Odyssey, and Moog Sonic six were duo-phonic meaning they could produce two different tones at once when two different keys were pressed. And in 1974 Oberheim produced the first polyphonic synthesizer using their Synthesizer Expansion Modules (which were originally designed to allow musicians to just layer more complex sounds together in a monophonic 'stack'). Oberheim utilized a digitally-scanned keyboard developed by Dave Rossum to assign a note to one of 2, 4, or 8 SEM modules. When more notes were hit than the number of modules available, the most recent note would have to 'steal' one of the SEM modules from the note it originally had been assigned to. Oberheim's polyphonic synthesizers were very popular. In 1976 Yamaha produced the CS-50, which had four voices that didn't have to be individually programmed in order for them to sound the same. A sea of other entries followed.

In 1970, Ken Freeman demonstrated the first 'string machine' which was essentially combo-organ like in size and how it generated tones. It had simple controls though centered around creating an ensemble effect where vibrato is happening at slightly different rates on different notes like in a real orchestra. Freeman used six discrete LFOs (low frequency oscillator circuits) to modulate atypically hit together note combinations (diminished fifth combinations like C and F♯). It had two 'ranks' of 12 oscillators plus a single oscillator driving a chip that develops the top octave of notes in the version that hit market in 1974. In November 1974 the British patent 1,509,530 lists an electronic digital musical arranger by Nicholas Kenneth Kirk. This patent was sold to Waddington's House of Games as Compute-a-Tune. This product was marketed in the early 1980s and sold a few thousand or so in the £15 range. The ARP Solina String Ensemble and Crumar Stringman used a much less expensive approach using digitally clocked chips called BBDs. Only a few hundred were made.

In 1973, the Yamaha GX-1 was manufactured. It was an early polyphonic synthesizer, featuring eight voices. In 1974, Roland Corporation released the EP-30, the first touch-sensitive keyboard. Roland also released early polyphonic string synthesizers, the RS-101 in 1975 and the RS-202 in 1976.

In 1975, the turn towards building a synthesizer of sorts over an organ came to fruition in Moog's Polymoog. Many patents exist from this keyboard. Each note had its own circuit board with a VCF/VCA chip so that it was truly fully polyphonic. Many were disappointed that the filter lacked the facilities of the more flexible moog filter used in other keyboards and the abundance of unreliable connectors. In 1975 Crumar of Italy produced the "Multiman" which also was an organ with synthesizer facilities. It had a bass option, a brass with filter controls and simple envelope, a piano and clavi preset, and a couple string tabs with decay control and vibrato control. In 1976 the ARP Omni combined a more limited synthesizer with a string machine and bass also and became ARP's biggest seller. In the same year, the Korg PE-1000 used an individual saw oscillator for each note.

In 1977, the Yamaha CS-60 and CS-80 polyphonic synthesizers began to implement synthesizer 'memory'. However, it was merely an alternate set of sliders that hid under a hatch. In 1978, the OB-1 from Oberheim gave actual electronic storage of the sound settings. The Sequential Circuits Prophet-5 the same year offered this feature in a five voice polyphonic synthesizer. Dave Smith's company developed some other firsts, but the ARP engineers were acquired by Fender when they bought the mismanaged company in 1979. They completed the Fender Rhodes Chroma, the first computer controlled keyboard. Released in 1981, an Apple computer could be used to run sequencing software that allowed the user to easily program which notes were being hit at particular instants in the song production. The 'Chroma' port only appeared on the successor though, the Chroma Polaris in 1984.

== MIDI keyboards ==
Dave Smith's company found interest in a cooperative effort with Roland. In 1983, the invention of MIDI as a standard for digital code transmission digital technology development spurred on more great development in keyboard technology, as now keyboards from different manufacturers could communicate through an inexpensive cable, jack and system of codes. The Sequential Circuits Prophet 600 and the Roland Jupiter 6 communicated via MIDI at the NAMM trade show and Yamaha soon had the standard implemented into their DX synthesizers which would outsell all previous keyboards.

The Yamaha DX7 used entirely digital circuitry leaving it free from the need of calibration, and vast numbers of parameters that could be accessed. The "FM" (frequency modulation) synthesis method was something that had not been explored to near this depth. Most synthesizers before this were subtractive synthesis, i.e. starting with a very harmonic-laden sound and selectively subtracting from this sound using low, high or bandpass filters, or some other methods that tended to result in stranger sounds, like ring modulation. Also in 1983, Dave Smith's company marketed the first polyphonic synthesizer keyboard that could play more than one sound at a time called the 'Six-Trak'. It had a six track sequencer and each track could access a different sound. The same year the SCI Pooppit T8 with optical key sensing became the first piano action emulating MIDI keyboard.

After ARP's demise, the remaining companies that had produced analog synthesizers rapidly began to feel the stress of the newly popular digital synths. Roland and Korg, also from Japan, developed some innovations of their own and each had 'hit' keyboards: the D-50 from Roland and M1 from Korg in the late 1980s. The total unit sales for the Yamaha DX series reached over 1 million with the others from Roland and Korg over 250,000. The success of the D-50 and M1 was riding on the back of the Kurzweil K250, which first applied this technology well in 1984. This machine was the first fully digital workstation with facilities to sample acoustic sounds with a microphone and play them back with a rate that is proportioned for the note being struck. Many great samples were included in the unit, including a piano sound that is still used in the 2000s. As well, the samples can be routed through a synthesizer architecture of some kind.

Initially, some companies steered away from emulating the subtractive synthesis in the digital realm because it was difficult to model how a filter would respond to these complex signals. By the early 1990s, some new implementations were beginning to appear. The Peavey DPM series also touted as the first keyboards that could import samples which were not 'sampling keyboards'. They also were the first to use off the shelf DSP chips, which emulated the response of analog filters. This sample playback technology also spawned a vast number of inexpensive consumer units called home keyboards in electronics stores and toy stores. As the price of memory began to plummet, almost every company was making keyboards of this type. Casio and Yamaha have led sales in these types of units, which feature built in speaker systems, usually can run from batteries or power adapters, and have a library of samples with very limited editing, if any. They often use cheap plastic strips of keys to keep costs down.

On a different note, the Kurzweil K150 and the Kawai K5 explored additive synthesis where harmonics can be proportioned to make different tones while enveloping groups of them differently in the mid-'80s. RMI had explored this to a limited extent in 1974 with the harmonic synthesizer they produced. This less common synthesis method is also used in Kawai's last synthesizer product series, the K5000s from 1996. Organs like the Hammond B-3 use drawbars to control harmonic content of the tone, but the K5000 has an envelope for each harmonic in the entire audio spectrum and dynamic filter control over that for vast possibilities in sound creation.
