= Electronic keyboard =

Musical instrument

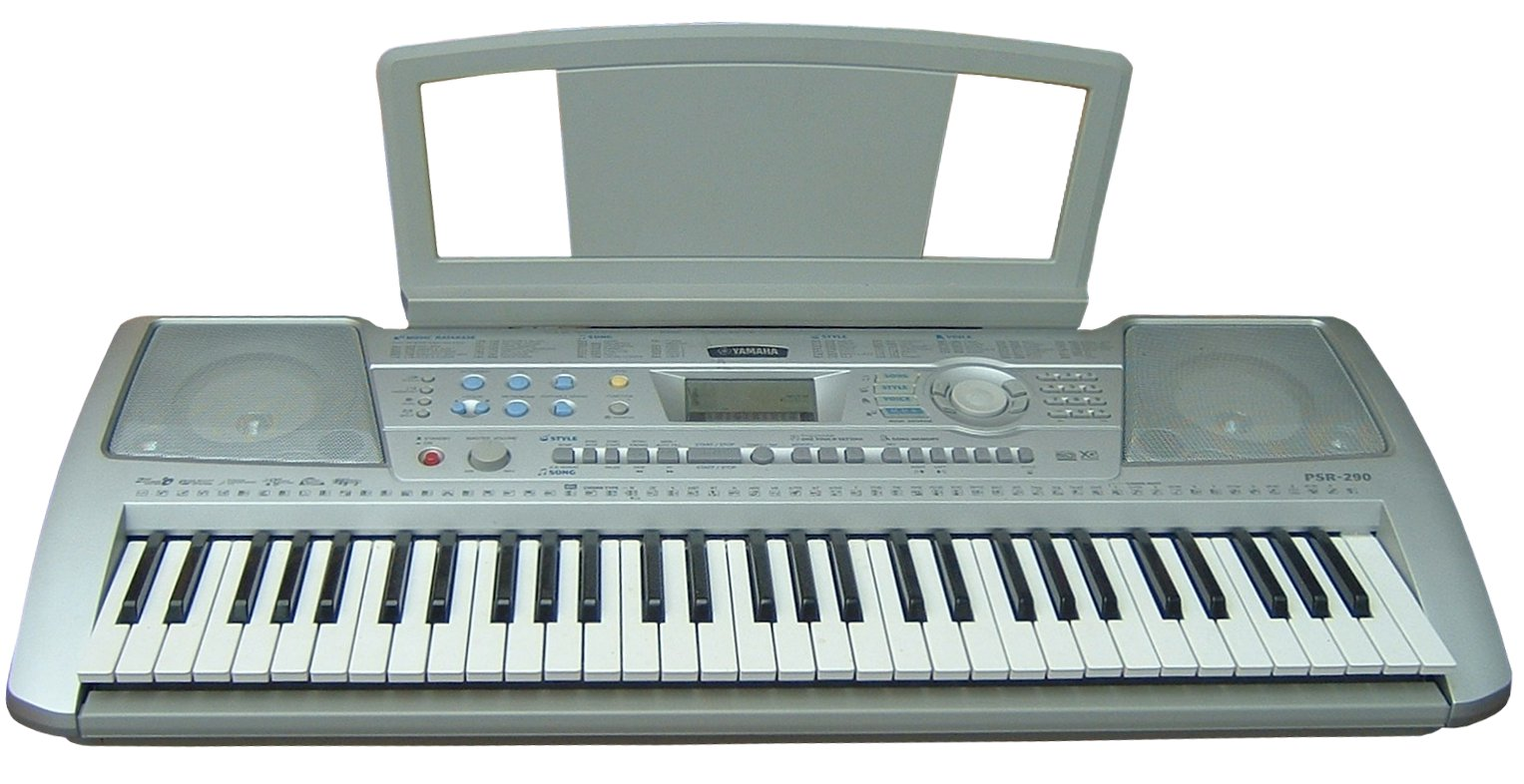
Yamaha PSR-290 (2001)

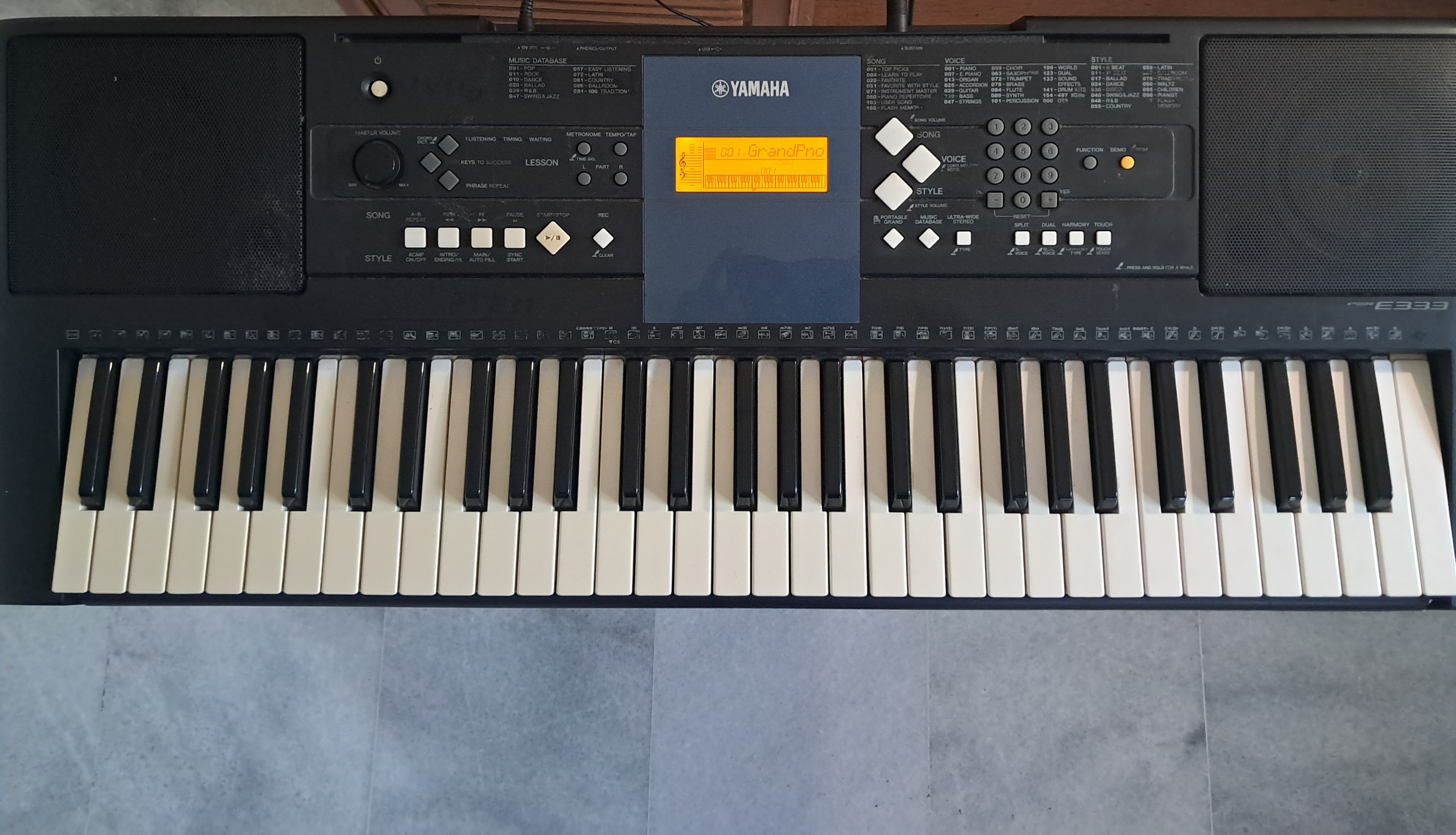
Yamaha PSR-E333 (2011)

A MIDI song played on a Casio electronic keyboard

An electronic keyboard, portable keyboard, or digital keyboard is an electronic musical instrument based on keyboard instruments. Electronic keyboards include synthesizers, digital pianos, stage pianos, electronic organs and digital audio workstations. In technical terms, an electronic keyboard is a rompler-based synthesizer with a low-wattage power amplifier and small loudspeakers.

Electronic keyboards offer a diverse selection of instrument sounds (piano, organ, violin, etc.) along with synthesizer tones. Designed primarily for beginners and home users, they generally feature unweighted keys. While budget models lack velocity sensitivity, mid-range options and above often include it. These keyboards have limited sound editing options, focusing on preset sounds. Casio and Yamaha are major manufacturers in this market, known for popularizing the concept since the 1980s.

== Terminology ==
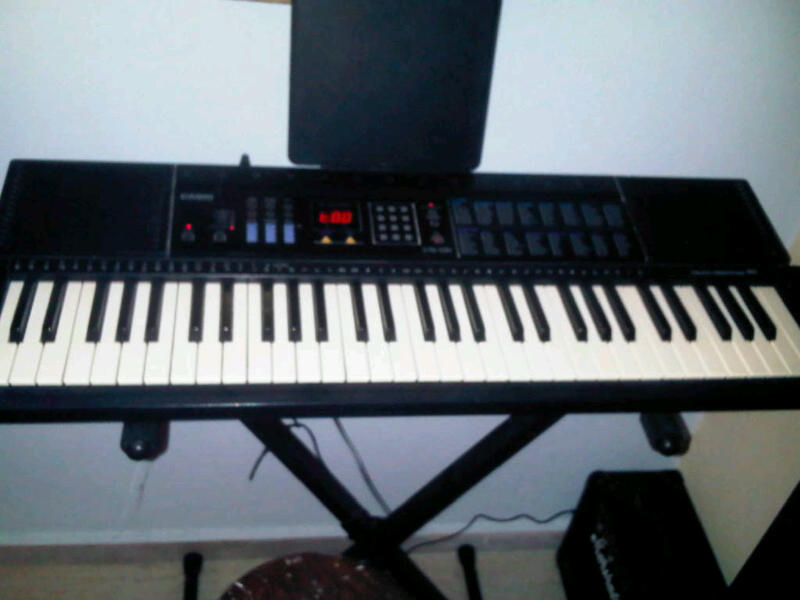
Casio CTK-530, an early-1990s electronic keyboard with PCM sound technology.

An electronic keyboard may also be called a digital keyboard, or home keyboard, the latter often refers to less advanced or inexpensive models intended for beginners. The obscure term "portable organ" was widely used in Asian countries to refer to electronic keyboards in the 1990s, due to the similar features between electronic keyboards and electronic home organs, the latter of which were popular in the late 20th century.

In Russia, Belarus and Ukraine, most types of electronic keyboards (including digital pianos and stage pianos) were simply often referred to as a "synthesizer" (Russian: синтезатор, sintezator), usually with no other term to distinguish them from actual digital synthesizers.

The term electronic keyboard may also be used to refer to a synthesizer or digital piano in colloquial usage

== Components ==
The major components of a typical modern electronic keyboard are:

- Musical keyboard: Electronic keyboards typically use unweighted keys for portability and affordability. In contrast, digital pianos have weighted or semi-weighted keys to replicate the feel of acoustic pianos.
- Firmware: A program (usually embedded in a computer chip) which handles user interaction with controllers such as the musical keyboard, menus, and buttons. These controllers enable the user to select different instrument sounds (e.g., piano, guitar, strings, drum kit), digital effects (reverb, echo, chorus or sustain), and other features (e.g., transposition, accompaniments, sequencer, recording, external media, etc.). The user interface system usually includes an LCD screen that gives the user information about the synthesized sound they have selected like tempo, or effects that are activated (e.g., reverb) and other features.
- Computerized musical arranger: A software program which produces rhythms and chords by the means of computerized commands, typically MIDI. Electronic hardware can also do this. Most computerized arrangers can play a selection of rhythms (e.g., rock, pop, jazz).
- Sound generator: A rompler, typically contained within an integrated Read-only memory (ROM), which is capable of accepting MIDI commands and producing sounds. Electronic keyboard romplers usually incorporate sample-based synthesis, but more advanced keyboards might sometimes feature physical modeling synthesis.
- Amplifier and speakers: an internal audio power amplifier, typically ranging from less than 2.5 to over 30 watts, connected to the sound generator chip. The amplifier is then connected to small, low-powered speakers that reproduce the synthesized sounds so that the listener can hear them. Older and less expensive keyboards may have a single mono speaker. Most keyboards usually have two speakers producing stereo sound, often with bass ports and tweeters for more advanced models.
- Power supply: Keyboards may or may not have an internal power supply system built to the main circuit board, but most modern keyboards are often equipped with an included AC adapter.
- MIDI terminals: Most keyboards usually incorporate 5-pin MIDI connections for data communication, typically so the keyboard can be connected with either a computer or another electronic musical instrument, such as a synthesizer, a drum machine or a sound module, allowing it to be used as a MIDI controller. Not all keyboards have conventional MIDI terminals and connector. The least expensive models may have no MIDI connections. Post-2000s keyboards may have a USB-B instead, which serve as both input and output in a single connection. Since the 2010s, MIDI in/out terminals are only available in professional-grade keyboards, stage pianos and high-end synthesizers, while low-cost home keyboards, digital pianos, and lower-end synthesizers use USB as the only connection available.
- Flash memory: Some electronic keyboards have a small amount of onboard memory (usually in several megabytes) for storing data such as recorded songs, MIDI files, and other proprietary files.
- External storage device: Usually available on professional-grade keyboards and synthesizers, this allows the user to store data in externally connected storage media such as ROM cartridges, floppy disks, memory cards and USB flash drives. Floppy disks and cartridges were obsolete by the early 2000s, with memory cards starting to replace them shortly afterwards. USB storage was popularized by Yamaha's lineup of high-end electronic keyboards in the mid-2000s and has become a standard feature since. Most keyboards since the 2010s use USB storage, with the exception of certain Casio models, which use SD cards instead.
- Music stand: A metal or plastic rack for holding sheet music or music books upright. The music stand is usually removable to facilitate storage and transportation.
- Sustain pedal: If a home keyboard has a sustain feature, replicating the similar device used on acoustic pianos, 1/4" jack is provided for this purpose. By comparison, on a digital piano, a sustain pedal is often built into the frame, usually with a proprietary connector. The least expensive home keyboards do not have a sustain function or a sustain pedal jack, which limits their use to early beginners.

== History ==
Keyboard instruments trace back to the ancient hydraulis in the 3rd century BCE, later evolving into the pipe organ and smaller portative and positive organs. The clavichord and harpsichord emerged in the 14th century CE, Technological strides brought more advanced keyboards, including the modern 12-tone version. Initially, instruments like the pipe organ and harpsichord could only produce single-volume sounds. The 18th-century innovation of the pianoforte, with hammers striking metal strings via key pressure, enabled dynamic sound variation.

Electric keyboards began with applying electric sound technology. The first was the Denis d'or stringed instrument, made by Václav Prokop Diviš in 1748, with 700 electrified strings. In 1760, Jean Baptiste Thillaie de Laborde introduced the clavecin électrique, an electrically activated keyboard without sound creation. Elisha Gray invented the musical telegraph in 1874, producing sound through electromagnetic vibrations. Gray later added a single-note oscillator and a diaphragm-based loudspeaker for audibility.

In 1973, the Yamaha GX-1 introduced an early polyphonic synthesizer with eight voices. The EP-30 by Roland Corporation in 1974 became the first touch-sensitive keyboard. Roland also released early polyphonic string synthesizers, the RS-101 in 1975 and RS-202 in 1976.

In 1975, Moog's Polymoog merged a synthesizer with an organ, offering full polyphony through individual circuit boards. Crumar's "Multiman" organ with synthesizer arrived, and ARP Omni combined a synthesizer with a string machine and bass in 1976. Korg's PE-1000 that year featured a dedicated saw oscillator for each note.

In 1977, Yamaha CS-60 and CS-80 polyphonic synthesizers introduced 'memory'. In 1978, Oberheim's OB-1 brought electronic storage of sound settings. That year, Sequential Circuits Prophet-5 offered the feature in a five-voice polyphonic synthesizer. Fender's Rhodes Chroma, the first computer-controlled keyboard, resulted from ARP's engineers being acquired by Fender in 1979. Its successor, the Chroma Polaris, released in 1984, featured the 'Chroma' port.

== Classifications ==
Conventional home keyboards differ from other electronic keyboards due to the design, features and target market:

- Digital piano - Electronic keyboards designed to sound and feel like an ordinary acoustic piano. They typically contain an amplifier and loudspeakers built into the instrument. In most cases they can fully replace acoustic pianos and provide several features, such as recording and saving files to a computer. Many digital pianos can imitate the sounds of several instruments, including a grand piano, electric piano, pipe organ, Hammond organ and harpsichord. They are not sensitive to the climate or humidity changes in a room and there is also no need for tuning, as with acoustic pianos. Digital pianos are often mounted on stands with a fixed sustain (or other) pedal attached to the frame; as such, most are not designed for transportation. The target market is mid-level to advanced pianists.
- Stage piano - A type of high-quality digital piano with weighted keys, designed for professional touring use on stage or in a recording studio. Compared to digital pianos, stage pianos usually emphasize on higher-quality electric piano and Hammond organ sounds.
- Synthesizer - Electronic keyboards that use various sound synthesis technologies to produce a wide variety of electronic sounds.
- Workstation - Professional electronic keyboards that combine the features of a synthesizer and a conventional home keyboard. Workstations have a range of high-quality sampled instrument sounds, as well as extensive editing/recording capability, computer connectivity, high-powered speakers, and often include external memory storage for storing customized data, MIDI sequences, and even additional instrument samples. A higher-end workstation keyboard may include several features similar to a digital audio workstation software, allowing an even more advanced features such as mixing, mastering, sound design, creating loops and patterns, composing electronic music, etc.
- MIDI controller - An electronic keyboard that does not produce a sound of its own. It is used to trigger sounds from a sound module or software synthesizer by means of MIDI cable and connections. MIDI controllers often provide other sliders, knobs and buttons, which enable the player to control elements such as volume.
- Keytar - A small synthesizer that resembles a guitar which can be played in similar position as an electric guitar: worn on a strap over the shoulders, enabling the performer to move around on a stage. The name is a portmanteau of keyboard and guitar.

Compared to digital pianos or stage pianos, digital home keyboards are usually much lower in cost, as they have unweighted keys. Like digital pianos, they usually feature on-board amplifiers and loudspeakers. Stage pianos, however, typically do not have integrated amplifiers and speakers, as these instruments are normally plugged into a keyboard amplifier in a professional concert setting. Unlike synthesizers, the primary focus of home electronic keyboards is not on detailed control or creation of sound synthesis parameters. Most home electronic keyboards offer little or no control or editing of the sounds (although a selection of 128 or more preset sounds is typically provided).

== Concepts and definitions ==
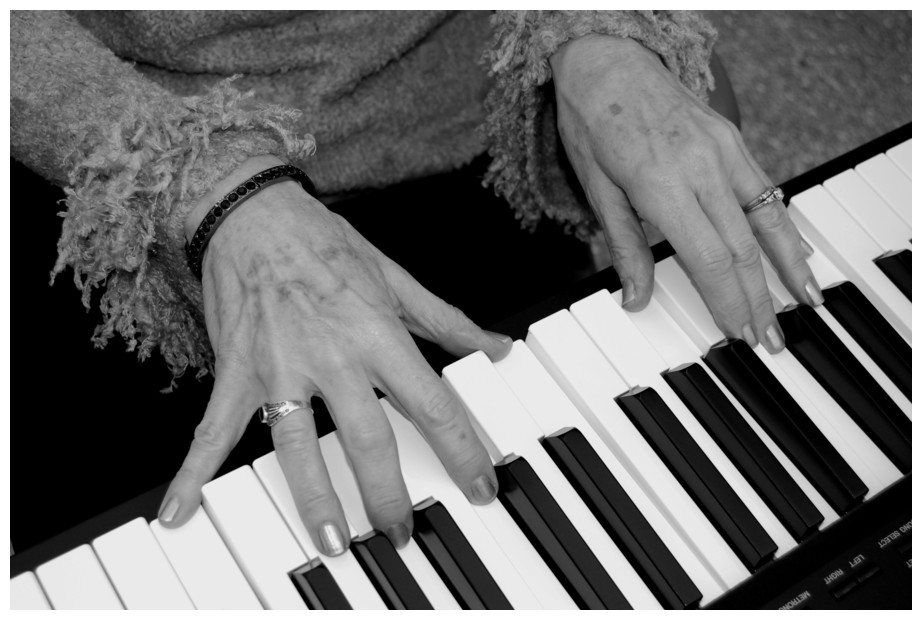
Playing an electronic keyboard.

- Auto accompaniment / chord recognition: Auto accompaniment allows single key presses to trigger entire chords, often within a specific rhythm and style (e.g., rock, pop). Many keyboards can automatically play these chords in tempo with an onboard rhythm track, and offer the ability to form complex chords like inversions.
- Demonstration: Most keyboards come with demo songs showcasing various sounds and effects. These can be used by salespeople, for self-learning with lighted keys highlighting the correct notes, or simply for enjoyment.
- Velocity sensitivity (or touch sensitivity) allows keyboards to mimic the sound variations caused by how hard a key is pressed. Cheaper keyboards offer basic volume control, while more expensive models replicate the tonal changes of acoustic instruments. This can be done with multiple sensors, multiple samples per key, or by modeling the sound behavior (ADSR envelope).
- After-touch: A feature brought in the late 1980s (although synthesizers like the CS-80 extensively used by artists like Vangelis featured after-touch as early as 1977) whereby dynamics are added after the key is hit, allowing the sound to be modulated in some way (such as fade away or return), based upon the amount of pressure applied to the keyboard. For example, in some synth voices, if the key continues to be pressed hard after the initial note has been sounded, the keyboard will add an effect such as vibrato or sustain. After-touch is found on many mid-range and high-range synthesizers, and is an important modulation source on modern keyboards. After-touch is most prevalent in music of the mid to late 1980s, such as the opening string-pad on Cock Robin's When Your Heart Is Weak, which is only possible with the use of after-touch (or one hand on the volume control). After-touch is not normally found on inexpensive, beginner-level home keyboards.
- Polyphony: In digital music terminology, polyphony refers to the maximum number of notes that can be produced by the sound generator at once. Polyphony allows significantly smoother and more natural transitions between notes. Inexpensive toy electronic keyboards designed for children can usually only play five to ten notes at a time. Many low priced keyboards can perform 24 or 32 notes at a time. More advanced keyboards can perform over 48 notes at a time with 64 or 128 notes being common. Digital pianos, has more complex polyphonic system and could perform by up to 256 notes.
- Multi-timbre: The ability to play more than one kind of instrument sound at the same time, such as with the Roland MT-32's ability to play up to eight different instruments at once.
- Split point: The point on a keyboard where the choice of instrument can be split to allow two instruments to be played at once. In the late 1980s it was common to use a MIDI controller to control more than one keyboard from a single device. The MIDI controller had no sound of its own, but was designed for the sole purpose of allowing access to more sound controls for performance purposes. MIDI controllers allowed one to split the keyboard into two or more sections and assign each section to a MIDI channel, to send note data to an external keyboard. Many consumer keyboards offer at least one split to separate bass or auto-accompaniment chording instruments from the melody instrument.

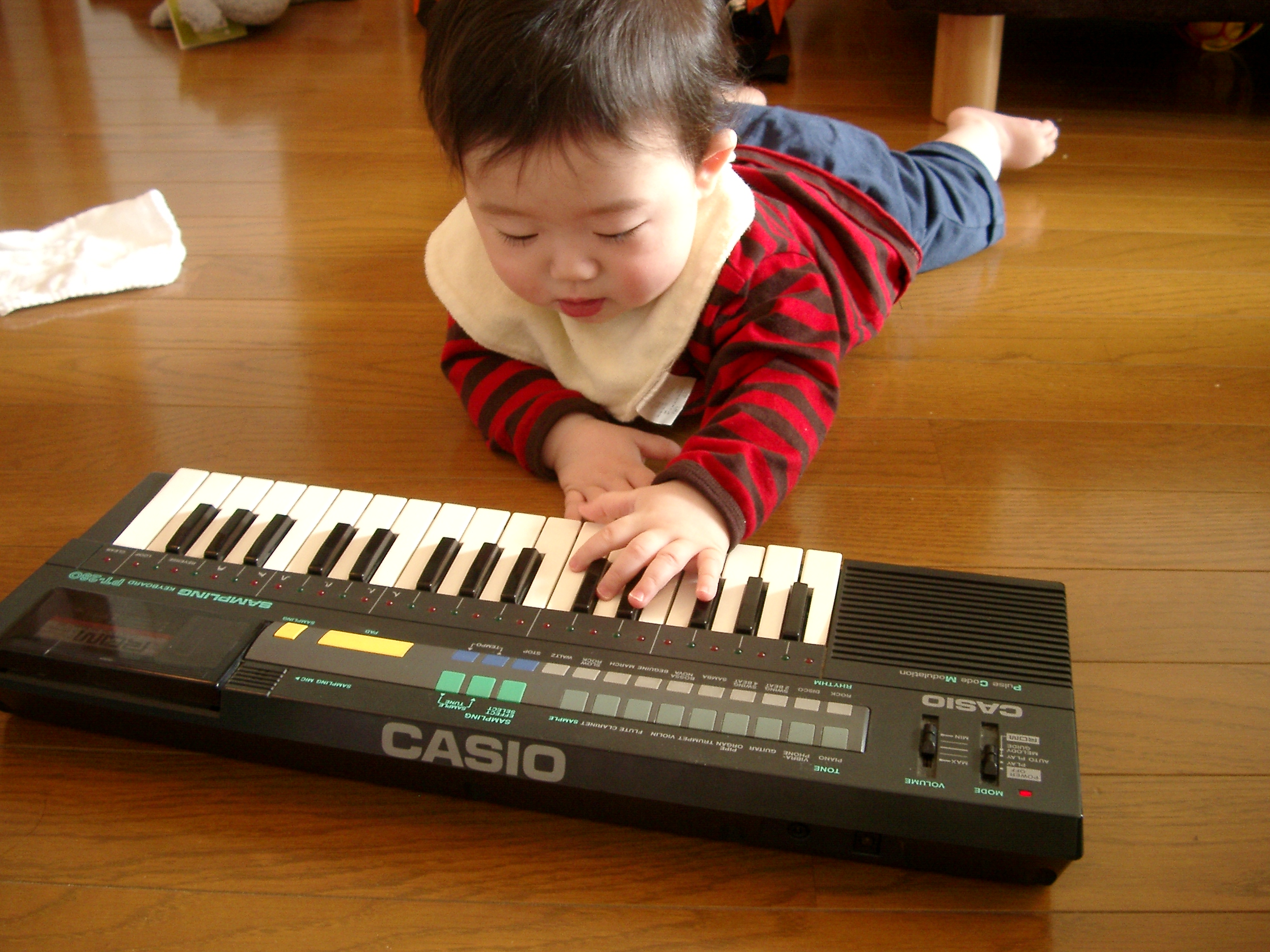
A child playing a Casio keyboard with small-size minikeys.

- Minikeys: Most electronic keyboards have keys that are similar to the size of keys on an acoustic piano. Some electronic keyboards have minikeys, either because they are targeted at child users or to make the instrument smaller and more portable.
- Accompaniment backing tracks: Pre-programmed musical accompaniment tracks (also called rhythm pattern or rhythm style by some manufacturers), consist of a variety of genres for the player to use (e.g., pop, rock, jazz, country, reggae). The keyboard plays a chord voicing and rhythm which is appropriate for the selected genre. In general, programmed backing tracks usually imitate the sound of a rhythm section or an ensemble. Certain keyboards may include a feature that allows the performer to create, compose and customize their own accompaniments. This feature is usually called a pattern sequencer, rhythm composer, or a style creator.
  - In addition to the basic accompaniment tracks, some keyboards have an extra feature to play different loops in conjunction with the backing track itself.
- Accompaniment sections and synchronization: Usually, backing tracks comprises two to four sections, as well as fill-in patterns, introduction/ending patterns, and various synchronizations to improve the effects of the accompaniment.
- Tempo: A parameter that determines the speed of rhythms, chords and other auto-generated content on electronic keyboards. The unit of this parameter is beats per minute. Many keyboards feature audio or visual metronomes (using graphics on a portion of the display) to help players keep time.
- Auto harmonization: A feature of some keyboards that automatically adds secondary tones to a note based upon chords given by the accompaniment system, to make harmony easier for players who lack the ability to make complex chord changes with their left hand.
- Wheels and knobs: Used to add effects to a sound that are not present by default, such as vibrato, panning, envelope, tremolo, pitch bending, portamento and so on. A common control on contemporary keyboards is the pitch bend wheel, adjusting the pitch of a note usually in the range of 2 semitones. The pitch bend wheel is usually on the left of the keyboard and is a spring-loaded potentiometer. Some keyboards include a joystick, which often combines all the aforementioned functions in one control unit.
- Drawbars: Usually found only on high-end, expensive keyboards and workstations, this feature allows the performer to emulate digitally-modeled sounds of a tonewheel organ (hence drawbar). It consists of nine editable virtual sliders that resemble the drawbars of a tonewheel organ, and features various effects such as rotary speaker, percussion, and tremolo.
- Piano simulation: A common feature of the digital piano, stage piano, and high-end workstations that allows real-time simulation of a sampled piano sound. It provides various piano-related effects, such as room reverberation, sympathetic resonance, piano lid position (as on a grand piano), and settings to adjust the tuning and overall sound quality.
- Keyboard action describes the mechanism and feel of the keyboard. Keyboards can be roughly divided into non-weighted and weighted.
  - Non-weighted keyboards have a light, springy feel to their keys, similar to the action of an organ. The least expensive keyboards, often with non-full size keys, use keys that are mounted on soft rubber pads that also act as electronic switches. Most electronic keyboards use spring-loaded keys that make some kinds of playing techniques, such as backhanded sweeps, impossible, but make the keyboards lighter and easier to transport. Players accustomed to acoustic piano keys may find non-weighted spring-action keyboards uncomfortable and difficult to play effectively. Conversely, keyboard players accustomed to the non-weighted action may encounter difficulty and discomfort playing on an acoustic piano.
  - Weighted keyboards indicate that some kind of effort has been made to give the keyboard more resistance and responsive feel similar to that of an acoustic piano.
    - Semi-weighted keys is a term applied to keyboards with spring action like a non-weighted keyboard but that have extra weight added to the keys to give them more resistance and responsive feel.
    - Hammer action keys use some kind of mechanism to replicate the action of a mechanical piano. This is often achieved with some kind of lever mechanism connected to the key.
    - Graded hammer action keys do what hammer action keys do, but also has a different feel on the low versus high notes as on a mechanical piano keyboard. The lower note keys have a higher resistance than the higher note keys.

== MIDI controls ==
MIDI is a serial data connection which operates with any make or model of instrument which provides for it. Electronic keyboards use MIDI, a universal language for digital instruments. MIDI transmits which notes are played, their duration, and often velocity (how hard a key is pressed). Keyboards translate key pressure into MIDI velocity data, which controls the loudness of the generated sound.

MIDI data can also be used to add digital effects to the sounds played, such as reverb, chorus, delay and tremolo. These effects are usually mapped to three of the 127 MIDI controls within the keyboard's infrastructure – one for reverb, one for chorus and one for other effects – and are generally configurable through the keyboard's graphical interface. Additionally, many keyboards have "auto-harmony" effects which will complement each note played with one or more notes of higher or lower pitch, to create an interval or chord.

DSP effects can also be controlled on the fly by physical controllers. Electronic keyboards often have two wheels on the left hand side, generally known as a pitch bend and a modulation wheel. The difference between these is that the pitch bend wheel always flicks back to its default position – the center – while the modulation wheel can be placed freely. By default, the pitch bend wheel controls the pitch of the note in small values, allowing the simulation of slides and other techniques which control the pitch more subtly. The modulation wheel is usually set to control a tremolo effect by default. However, on most electronic keyboards, the user will be able to map any MIDI control to these wheels. Professional MIDI controller keyboards often also have an array of knobs and sliders to modulate various MIDI controls, which are often used to control DSP effects.

Most electronic keyboards also have a socket at the back, into which a foot switch can be plugged. The most common function is to simulate the sustain on a piano by turning on and off the MIDI control which adds sustain to a note. However, since they are also simple MIDI devices, foot switches can usually be configured to turn on and off any MIDI controlled function, such as switching one of the DSP effects, or the auto-harmony.

== See also ==
- Synthesizer
- Digital piano
- Electronic organ
- MIDI controller
- Sound module
- Software synthesizer
