= Roland VP-330 =

Analog vocoder and string synthesizer from Roland Corporation

VP-330
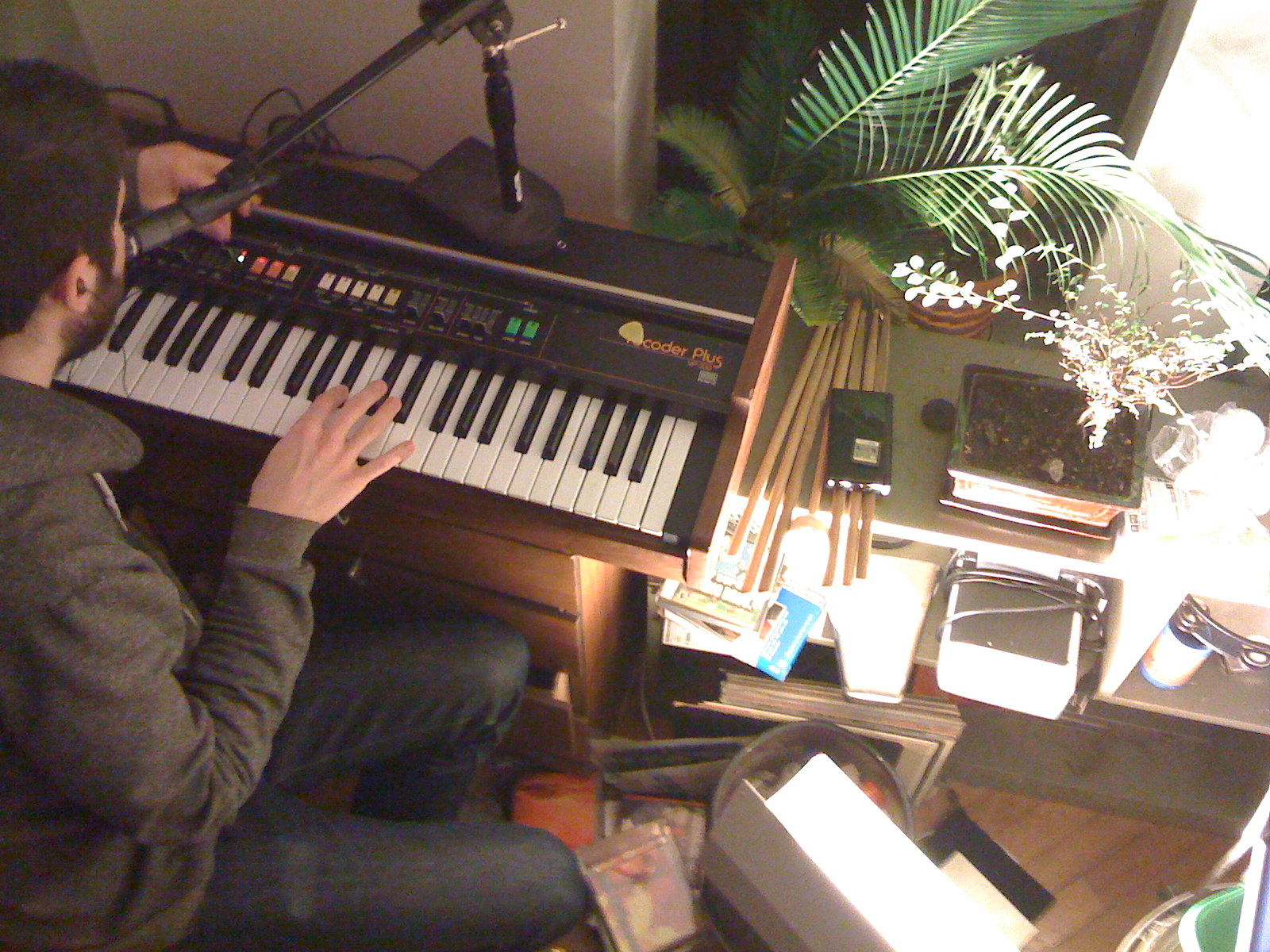
- A Roland VP-330 Vocoder Plus
- Manufacturer: Roland Corporation
- Dates: 1979-1980
- Price: US$2,695 equivalent to $11,676 in 2024

Technical specifications
- Polyphony: Paraphonic
- Oscillator: Single master VCO divided into full note range
- LFO: Sine wave
- Synthesis type: Analog subtractive
- Filter: 7 band-pass for human voice tones; 10 band-pass for vocoder
- Attenuator: Single attack and release shared by all voices
- Aftertouch expression: No
- Velocity expression: No
- Effects: 2 parallel BBDs per channel (4 BBDs total) for stereo ensemble effect

Input/output
- Keyboard: 49 keys
- Left-hand control: Pitch bend
- External control: Vocoder hold via foot switch

The Roland VP-330 is a paraphonic ten-band combined digital/analog vocoder and string machine manufactured by Roland Corporation from 1979 to 1980. While there are several string machines and vocoders, a single device combining the two is rare, despite the advantage of paraphonic vocoding, and the VP-330's synthetic choir sounds are unique. Despite the VP-330's electronic string and choir sounds being less realistic than those of the tape-based Mellotron, touring musicians used it as a lighter and more robust alternative.

The Roland SVC-350 is a similar vocoder in rack-mount form designed to accept external inputs.

== Architecture ==
In addition to vocoding and generating string sounds, the VP-330 can also play four different choir sounds, each of which uses four bandpass filters, shared from the same pool of seven total. Like Roland's other string machines of the era, such as the RS-202, it features a BBD-based ensemble effect that thickens the strings, and optionally the choirs and vocoder.

== Notable users ==
- 10cc
- Laurie Anderson (on O Superman)
- BT
- Michael Boddicker (on Michael Jackson's P.Y.T. (Pretty Young Thing))
- A Certain Ratio
- Vince Clarke
- Phil Collins
- Stevie Wonder
- John Foxx
- Greg Hawkes (of The Cars)
- Tony Mansfield
- Mike Oldfield
- Queen
- Isao Tomita
- Underworld
- Vangelis (including on the Chariots of Fire and Blade Runner soundtracks)
- Yellow Magic Orchestra
- Minoru Mukaiya from Casiopea
- Koz (on Levitating)

== Legacy ==
In 2016, Roland made a digital recreation of the VP-330, named the VP-03, as part of their Boutique range. In 2019, Behringer released their own VP-330 clone, the VC340.
