= Delaborde =

Delaborde may refer to:

- Élie-Miriam Delaborde, concert pianist, (1839–1913), illegitimate son of Charles-Valentin Alkan
- Henri François Delaborde, Napoleonic general (1764–1833)
- Henri Delaborde (fencer), competitor in 1896 Olympics
- Henri Delaborde (painter)
- Jean-Baptiste Thillaie Delaborde, (9 June 1730 – late January 1777), a French physical scientist, mathematician and Jesuit priest.
