= Behringer Poly D =

Musical Instrument

Poly D
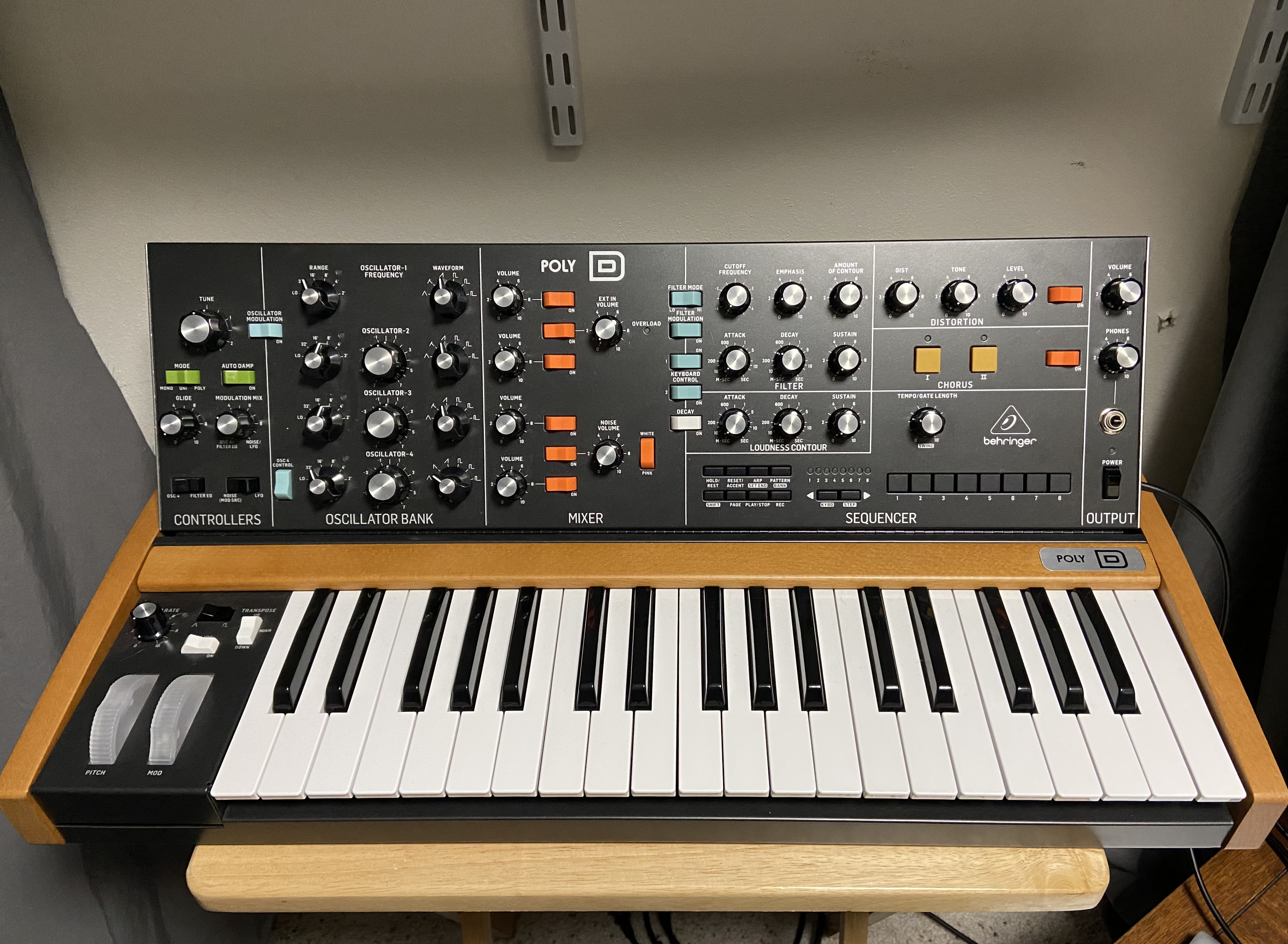
- Behringer Poly D
- Manufacturer: Behringer
- Dates: 2019

Technical specifications
- Polyphony: Monophonic, Paraphonic, Unison
- Timbrality: Monotimbral
- LFO: 0.05 Hz - 200 Hz
- Synthesis type: Analog subtractive
- Filter: 24dB/oct, 4-pole lowpass filter with cutoff, resonance, ADSR envelope generator, keyboard tracking
- Attenuator: ADSR envelope generator
- Aftertouch expression: 0 - +5 V Afterpressure
- Storage memory: Sequencer pattern only: 8 banks (8 patterns per bank)
- Effects: Distortion, BBD Stereo Chorus

Input/output
- Keyboard: 37 notes
- Left-hand control: Pitch bend and mod wheels
- External control: MIDI in/out/thru/USB B, Loudness, Oscillator, Modulation source, Filter

The Poly D is an analog synthesizer first made by Behringer in 2019. The Poly D is based largely on the Moog Minimoog, which was first produced from 1970-1981. The Poly D is the sixth such vintage synthesizer that Behringer has cloned.

== Release ==
In 2016, Behringer announced that they would be releasing their first ever production synth for retail, the Deepmind 12/6, followed shortly thereafter by the Deepmind 12D, a desktop variant of the Deepmind. These synths were in turn followed the Neutron, Crave, TD-3 and Model D.

On November 27, 2019, Behringer announced that they would be releasing the Poly D, though at the time only pre-orders were available from Thomann. The Poly D was originally priced at £599 or €699, respectively.

== Design and features ==
The Poly D weighs 22.5 pounds and has dimensions of 90 x 648 x 361 mm. The synth has four analog oscillators, which can be merged into one voice, two voices with two oscillators per voice, or split into one voice per oscillator. The oscillators are analog, not digital, and thus require occasional tuning.

There are wooden panels on either side, and the back panel is made of black aluminium, closely resembling a Minimoog. The marketable differences from the Minimoog lie in the addition of aftertouch, the BBD Stereo Chorus, DS-1 modeled distortion circuit, Behringer arpeggiator and 32 step sequencer, and the aforementioned switchable voice modes.

== See also ==
- Synthesizer clone
