= Neutron (synthesizer) =

Analogue semi-modular synthesizer

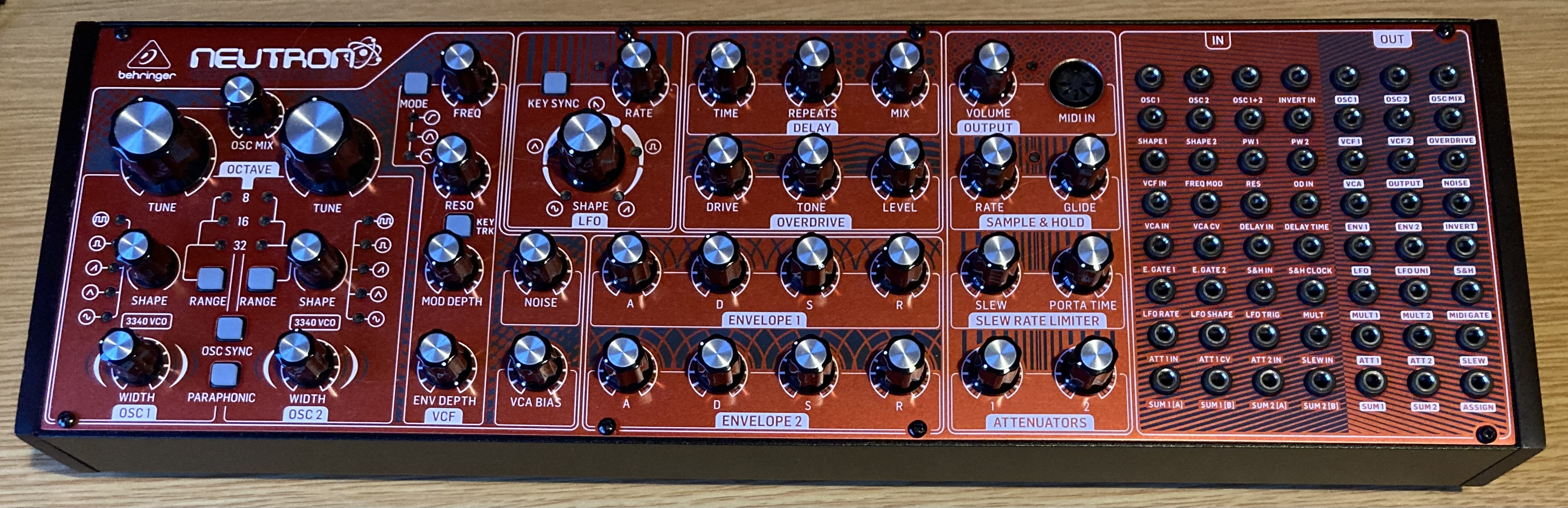
- Manufacturer: Behringer

Technical specifications
- Polyphony: monophonic (with paraphonic mode)
- Oscillator: two VCOs
- LFO: LFO with five waveforms
- Synthesis type: analog subtractive
- Filter: multi-mode VCF
- Effects: delay and overdrive

Input/output
- External control: MIDI and CV

The Neutron is a dual-oscillator monophonic synthesizer manufactured by Behringer. Released in 2018, the Neutron has an analogue signal path and uses subtractive synthesis to produce sounds. It is semi-modular and compatible with Eurorack voltages.

== Release ==
The Neutron was announced in January 2018 and was received well by critics. Priced around £300, a relatively low price point for analogue synthesizers, critics highlighted how the Neutron packs in a lot of features for its cost. The Neutron's original design was seen as a surprising due to Behringer's habit of cloning vintage synthesizers. However, criticism was made of the delay circuit, which bled into the signal path when muted.

== Design ==
The Neutron was designed in the United Kingdom by engineers at Midas. It has a red faceplate and can be used as a desktop unit or taken out its casing to be used as a Eurorack module.

The synthesizer has two oscillators based on the Curtis Electromusic CEM3340, which powered popular synthesizers such as the Roland SH-101 and Sequential Circuits Prophet 5. Each oscillator has five blendable waveforms: sine, triangle, sawtooth, square and "tone mod", a waveshaping oscillator. There is oscillator sync, PWM and a noise source. A mix knob blends the mixture of both oscillators. External sounds can be run through the signal chain. The oscillator range can be changed using the "range" button. The full range of the oscillators is +/-10 octaves. The Neutron has a paraphonic mode to assign each oscillator to a separate note. There is "poly-chaining" functionality, letting you link multiple units together to play polyphonically.

Neutron has a two-pole multimode 12 dB/octave filter with resonance control. It has low-pass, band-pass and high-pass modes (using the patchbay, other filter shapes can be created). The filter can self-oscillate and has key-tracking.

There are several modulation sources on Neutron, including an LFO, two envelopes and sample and hold. The LFO is bi-polar and has five blendable waveshapes: sine, triangle, sawtooth, square and ramp (reverse sawtooth). It can reach rates of 10 kHz for audio rate modulation. Neutron's two envelopes are ADSR. The Neutron also has a slew limiter and two attenuators.

In terms of effects, the Neutron has a bucket-brigade delay chip with control over time, mix and feedback. It also has an overdrive section with control over drive, level and tone. The Neutron's patchbay allows reconfiguration of the original signal path. It has 56 patch points in total, 32 inputs and 24 outputs.

The Neutron's firmware was updated in December 2018. The 2.0 update added keyboard splits, glide, pitch bend levels and other functions.

== Later models ==
In March 2022, Behringer announced the Proton. Similar to the Neutron, the Proton has the same oscillator section as the Neutron. However, the Proton includes substantially more modules, including two looping ASR envelopes, two LFOs (one more than the Neutron), another filter, a waveshaper and sub-oscillators. The Proton has 64 patch points, eight more than the Neutron.
