= Vector measuring current meter =

Instrument used for measuring horizontal velocity in the upper ocean

A vector measuring current meter (VMCM) is an instrument used for obtaining measurements of horizontal velocity in the upper ocean, which exploits two orthogonal cosine response propeller sensors that directly measure the components of horizontal velocity. VMCM was developed in the late 1970s by Drs. Robert Weller and Russ Davis and commercially produced by EG&G Sealink System (currently EdgeTech). The instrument has the capability of one year long deployment at depths of up to 5000 m. Both laboratory and field test results show that the VMCM is capable of making accurate measurements of horizontal velocity in the upper ocean. The VMCM is the current standard for making high quality velocity measurements in near-surface regions and it has been used for benchmarking other current meters.

== Equipment ==
The main components of a VMCM are its two orthogonal cosine response propeller sensors, that directly measure the components of horizontal velocity parallel to their axes. The orientation of the instrument with respect to magnetic north is sensed with a flux-gate compass, which permits to evaluate the direction of flux, providing the angle of the Y axis with respect to the magnetic North. A microprocessor rotates the X-Y coordinates in the conventional east–west and north–south components of velocity. This is done once each sample interval and, at the end of the record interval, the conventional components of velocity are averaged and the averages are stored on a cassette magnetic tape. Other components of the system are a bearing retainer, an end cap, an outer bearing race, a ball retainer and bearing balls, an encoder and an epoxy or Noryl plastic disk with four magnets, pressure window, an aluminum disk, two magnetodiodes mounted asymmetrically on a printed circuit ring, a hub, and a shaft with inner races machined in it. The function of the magnetodiodes is detecting the rotation of the propeller sensors.

Incorporated in the system there is the vector averaging electronics, that uses the pulses from the magnetodiodes and the instrument heading from the flux-gate compass to calculate and record the velocity components. In the 1990s, Way et al. upgraded the electronics by redesigning the vector measuring circuitry, data acquisition, and storage components and retaining instead the propeller sensors assembly, which proved to be reliable in the several tests accomplished. A pressure case houses the electronics and the appendage on which the propellers are mounted.

In its first design of the late 1970s, a VMCM was approximately 2.56 m high and had a mass of 34.5 kg in air. The original VMCM is no longer commercially available from EG&G (currently EdgeTech). The 1970s electronics components are outdated and difficult, if not impossible, to find. Like many of the electronic components the original flux gate compass is no longer available.

=== Propeller sensors ===
The innovation brought from VMCM over other current meters results from the choice of the biaxial propeller sensors, developed with accurate cosine response, and the design of the instrument so that flow interference with the instrument body was minimized.

"Cosine response" refers to propellers that only respond to the component of flow parallel to their axis of rotation. Their revolution rate is then proportional to the magnitude of the flow times the cosine of the angle between the axle and the flow vector. If the angular response function of the propellers is cosinusoidal, then two such sensors at right angles with their axes in the horizontal plane measure orthogonal components of horizontal velocity directly. No computation of components is necessary (though they are rotated from the instrument reference frame into the conventional east–west and north–south components), and summing the components accomplishes the vector averaging.

The advantages of a propeller with cosine response have been widely recognized. Weller and Davis designed the propeller sensors and their location within the pressure cage in order to obtain a response as close as possible to an ideal cosinusoidal angular response. After having fabricated and tested several families of propellers, they found the best response in a dual propeller (two propellers fixed on an axle) sensor with two five-bladed, 30-degree pitch propellers with diameter of 22 cm. The propellers are hard anodized, epoxy coated on the exterior, and protected by zinc anodes. They have been made from polycarbonate plastic (Lexan) and, more recently, from Noryl. Propeller sensors make use of Cartesian coordinate system and provide orthogonal velocity components in the horizontal plane. The measured coordinates need only be rotated in the conventional directions east–west and north–south.

=== Pressure cage ===
The pressure case houses the electronics and the appendage on which the propellers are mounted on. It is fabricated from 6A1-4V titanium alloy rod (1.27 cm diameter), which withstand higher yield strength than steel and has a superior resistance to corrosion and metal fatigue in the seawater. Designed in this way, the pressure cage is capable of taking tensions of up to 10,000 pounds and hold the electronics and the propeller sensors in isolation of the tension. This permits a safe working until 5,000 m depth.

Early on, the propeller bearings were a source of failure. After considerable testing, the bearings were upgraded from polycarbonate plastic to silicon nitride and, as a result of this change, there have not been any bearing failures.

=== Data logger/controller ===
In the early 1990s, Brian S. Way et al. developed a new version of the VMCM and greatly improved the electronic system. The new version of the VMCM includes as primary subunits the vector measuring front-end (consisting of rotor and compass hardware interface) and a low-power microcontroller to accomplish the sampling. Initial sampling setup (e.g. sample rate, averaging interval, calibration factors) is set by command from an Onset Computer (Tattletale 8, TT8). However, actual sampling and computation of vector averages are handled in the VMCM front-end subunit. A Microchip Technology PIC microcontroller handles all of these tasks, producing current vector North and East (Vn and Ve) reading at the desired interval.

In standard operation with the new version of VMCM, the PIC microcontroller in the VMCM front-end samples the rotors and compass at the rate set by the TT8 initially. At each sample, rotor and compass readings are accumulated for vector-averaging and, at the chosen sample interval, the vector averages Vn and Ve are relayed to the TT8 for further processing and/or storage.

=== User interface / Setup software ===
The main setup program gives the user the ability to choose from the following commands: record interval, which parameters to log (it is possible to add measurement of other parameters such as temperature, conductivity, oxygen, word time updated with each record, tilt, battery voltage), sample intervals for each selected parameter, start time to begin logging end time to stop logger. In the new version of the VMCM, the ease and flexibility for setting up and adding sensors has decreased the time needed for pre-deployment instrument preparation in port.

== How VMCM computes horizontal velocity ==
The two orthogonal cosine response propeller sensors directly measure the components of horizontal velocity parallel to their axes. The flux-gate compass senses the orientation of the instrument with respect to magnetic North and permits to evaluate the direction of flux. The microprocessor rotates the coordinates in the conventional east–west and north–south components of velocity. This is done once each sample interval and, at the end of the record interval, the conventional components of velocity are averaged and the averages are stored. The rotation of the propeller sensors is detected by the magnetodiodes. As a result of the asymmetry in placement of the magnetodiodes, a staggered pair of pulses is produced each quarter revolution; the phase relationship indicates the sense of direction of rotation and the pulse rate indicates the rate of rotation.

In order to calculate and record the velocity components, the vector averaging circuitry is turned on by a rotor count, which is signaled by a proper sequence of changes in the levels of the magnetodiodes. The instrument heading ($\theta$) is determined and stored in a register and updated at a 1-Hz rate (once each second). If either propeller rotates sufficiently (the original version of VMCM had a speed threshold of less than one centimeter per second), a pair of pulses is produced by the magnetodiodes of one hub and a count occurs from the rotor. Then, the cosine and sine of the heading (that is currently stored in the heading register) are added to the proper register that stores the $u$ and $v$ velocity components. To accomplish this, at the end of each sampling interval over which the averaging is performed, the following sums are evaluated:

$$\bar{u} = \sum_{i=1}^N cos(\theta_i) + \sum_{j=1}^M sin(\theta_j)$$

and

$$\bar{v} = - \sum_{i=1}^N sin(\theta_i) + \sum_{j=1}^M cos(\theta_j)$$

where N is the number of quarter revolutions by the sensor oriented east–west when $\theta$ = 0, M is the number of quarter revolutions by the other sensor, and $\theta i$ and $\theta j$ are the headings of the instrument in the heading register when the ith and jth pairs of pulses were supplied by the two propeller sensors. The velocity components are stored in a 12-bit registers and, at the end of each sampling interval, they are written as 16-bit words (12 bits of data, 4 bits identifying the channel) on a flash drive support (in its original design of the late 1970s, a cassette tape with more limited storage capacity was used).

The instruments typically record average $u$ and average $v$ every sample interval and time every hour. Two other channels of information, such as temperature and pressure, can be recorded. Various sample intervals can be selected. As the vector averaging circuitry is turned on only when a pair of magnetodiode pulses occurs, the current drain is proportional to the flow rate of the water.

== Comparison with other measuring instruments ==
Based on the intercomparison of the test data obtained from the VMCM and from other measuring instruments such as Aandera, VACM, electromagnetic current meters, and ACM, it has been experienced that VMCM sensor introduces the least error in relatively small mean flows when high frequency oscillatory fluctuations are also present. (because of surface waves, mooring motion, or both). This quality, together with the accuracy of the propeller sensors experienced in steady, unsteady flows, and combinations of both, make the VMCM appropriate to make accurate measurements in the upper ocean.
