= EG&G =

Defunct American national defense contractor (1947–2010)

- Formerly: Edgerton, Germeshausen, and Grier, Inc.
- Industry: Photography; Radiography; Government services
- Founded: 1947; 79 years ago
- Founders: Harold Edgerton; Kenneth Germeshausen; Herbert E. Grier
- Defunct: January 1, 2010
- Fate: Merger
- Successors: URS Corporation; AECOM
- Headquarters: Boston, Massachusetts, U.S., United States
- Products: Krytron; Rapatronic camera; Image intensifier

EG&G, formally known as Edgerton, Germeshausen, and Grier, Inc., was an American national defense contractor and provider of management and technical services. The company was involved in contracting services to the United States government during World War II and conducted the research and development on the nuclear weapons during the Cold war era (from 1948 and onward) together with the American national laboratories in Nevada Test Site.

It had close involvement with some of the government's most sensitive technologies, including providing support to stealth development led by Lockheed Martin, also in Nevada.

== History ==
=== Early history ===
In 1931, Massachusetts Institute of Technology (MIT) professor Harold Edgerton, a pioneer of high-speed photography, partnered with his graduate student Kenneth Germeshausen to found a small technical consulting firm. The two were joined by fellow MIT graduate student Herbert E. Grier in 1934. Bernard "Barney" O'Keefe became the fourth member of their fledgling technology group.

The group's high-speed photography was used to image and radiography the implosion-type tests during the Manhattan Project in 1945. The same skills in precisely timed high-power electrical pulses also formed a key enabling technology for nuclear weapon triggers. After the war, the group continued their association with the burgeoning military nuclear effort and formally incorporated Edgerton, Germeshausen, and Grier, Inc. in 1947.

=== 1950s and 1960s ===
During the 1950s and 1960s, the EG&G was involved in nuclear tests as a prime contractor for the U.S. Atomic Energy Commission, later the U.S. Department of Energy (DOE). During that time, the company extensively managed and operated the Nevada Test Site (NTS) for researching and developing the nuclear weapons together with American nuclear physics laboratories (LLNL, LANL, and SNL), as well developing the remote sensing technologies at the Nellis Air Force Base in Nevada. The EG&G had shared operations responsibility for the NTS with Livermore, Raytheon Services Nevada, Reynolds Electrical and Engineering Company (REECO), SOC LLC, Los Alamos Labs, Sandia Labs, and others.

Subsequently, the EG&G expanded its range of services, providing facilities management, technical services, security, and fighter pilot training for the U.S. military and other government departments. EG&G built a variety of sensing, detection and imaging products including night vision equipment, sensors for detection of nuclear material and chemical and biological weapons agents, and a variety of acoustic sensors. The company also supplied microwave and electronic components to the government, security systems, and systems for electronic warfare and mine countermeasures.

=== 1970s and 1980s ===
During the 1970s and 1980s, the company, then led by O'Keefe, diversified by acquisition into the fields of paper making, instrumentation for scientific, marine, environmental and geophysical users, automotive testing, fans and blowers, frequency control devices and other components including BBD and CCD technology via their Reticon division. In early to late 1980s, the EG&G had supported the work of the Skunk Works in developing the stealth technology. In the late 1980s and early 1990s most of these divisions were sold, and on 28 May 1999, the non-government side of EG&G Inc.; formerly NYSE: EGG; purchased the Analytical Instruments Division of PerkinElmer for US$425 million (equivalent to $821.39 million in 2025), also assuming the PerkinElmer name (NYSE: PKI).

At the time EG&G was based in Wellesley, Massachusetts, and made products for diverse industries including automotive, medical, aerospace and photography. At least in 1988, there was either a subsidiary or internal department of EG&G dubbed EG & G Biomolecular that produced the Acugen 402 DNA sequencer, the first (and perhaps only) commercially available automated DNA sequencer that used slab gel electrophoresis and radioactive Sanger sequencing.

=== 1999–present ===
From 1999 until 2001, EG&G was wholly owned by The Carlyle Group.

In August 2002, the defense-and-services sector of the company was acquired by defense technical-services giant URS Corporation. URS' EG&G division is headquartered in Gaithersburg, Maryland, and employs over 11,000 people. During its heyday in the 1980s, EG&G had about 35,000 employees.

In December 2009, URS announced its decision to discontinue the use of "EG&G" as a division name. The headquarters issued a press release stating that by January 1, 2010, it would discontinue using secondary corporate brands, including the EG&G name and logo. In the same press release, URS stated that it would also retire two other acquired brands, Washington Group and Lear Siegler. URS Chief Executive Officer Martin Koffel explained the change in an e-mail transmitted to employees: "In today's marketplace, it is essential we present a consistent, unified brand to our customers and achieve the competitive advantages enjoyed by our peers in the industry. ... This change will allow us to present a single brand that is easily understood by our clients". Koffel indicated that the move to a single corporate brand would affect neither the internal organization nor the existing reporting structure. However, EG&G Division would become URS Federal Services.

In 2014, URS was acquired by AECOM. In January 2020, AECOM sold its Management Services division, which provides services and support to governmental clients, to the private equity firm American Securities and Lindsay Goldberg for US$2.405 billion (equivalent to $2.99 billion in 2025); the new firm was named Amentum.

== Janet Airlines ==
EG&G's "Special Projects" division was the notable operator of the Janet Terminal at McCarran International Airport Las Vegas, Nevada, a service used to transport employees to remote government locations in Nevada and California. EG&G also had a joint venture with Raytheon Technical Services, creating JT3 LLC (JT4 LLC in present as of 2025) in 2000, which operates the Joint Range Technical Services contract in support of the United States Air Force.

== Lear Siegler Services, Inc. ==
EG&G Technical Services, Inc. and Lear Siegler Services, Inc. consolidated, becoming one of the nation's leading U.S. federal government contractors providing operations and maintenance, systems engineering and technical assistance, and program management, primarily to the Departments of Defense and Homeland Security. The companies are separate legal entities, but share a common management. In December 2009, URS announced its decision to discontinue the Lear Siegler name for this division.

== EG&G's clients ==
- Atomic Energy Commission
- Area 51
- Central Intelligence Agency
- Defense Logistics Agency
- Department of Defense
- Department of Energy
- Department of Transportation
- Black projects
- Nuclear weapons
- Enduring Stockpile
- War reserve stock

== See also ==
- Krytron
- Tactical Control System
