= Paraphony =

Musical term

Paraphony is a term which has three distinct meanings in the field of music.

== In musical theory ==
Paraphony is a term used in musical vernacular to refer to consonances which rely upon intervals of fifths and fourths. This terminology can be traced to ancient Greece and sources such as Theon of Smyrna.

== In electronic music ==
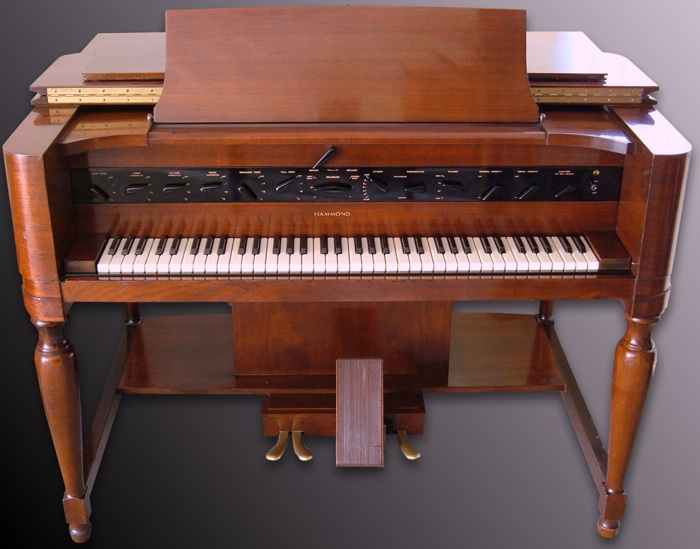
Hammond Novachord (1939)

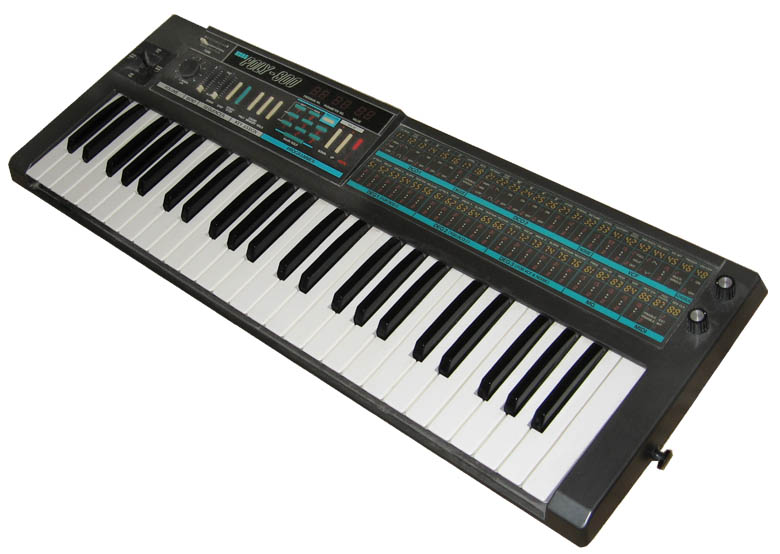
Korg Poly-800 (1983)

Completely unrelated to the above sense, a synthesizer is called paraphonic if it can play multiple pitches at once, but those pitches share part of their electronic signal paths. For example, the Roland RS-202 string machine could play several dozen pitches at once, but only with a single shared volume envelope, requiring the collective chord to swell and diminish as a single cohesive whole. Similarly, the Korg Poly-800 had 8 oscillators and could produce 8 voices, but had just one filter circuit shared by all of them. Other examples include the Roland VP-330 vocoder and the Moog Sub 37.

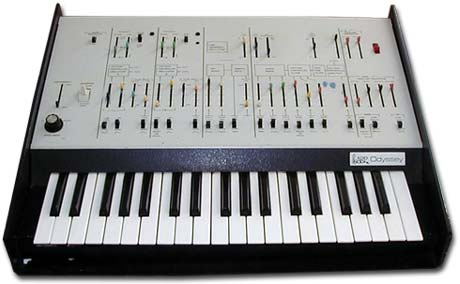
ARP Odyssey (1971)

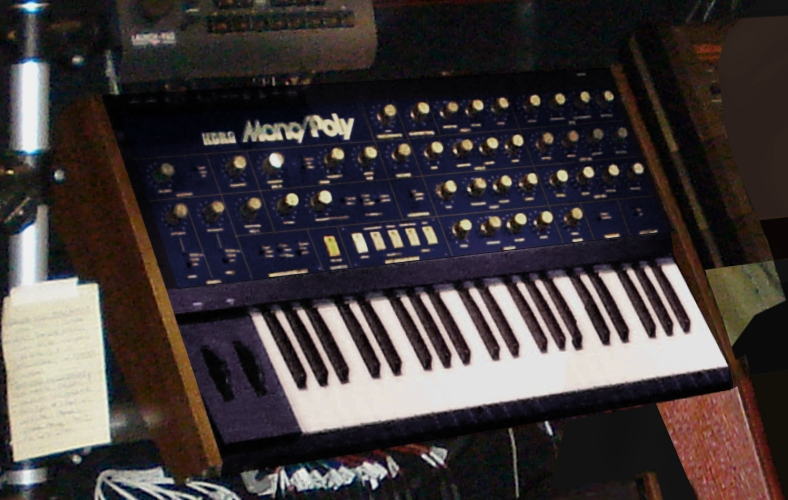
Korg Mono/Poly (1981)

=== Demonstration ===
==== Non-paraphonic polyphony ====
The following example simulates how we would expect a non-paraphonic polyphonic synthesizer (i.e. one with an individual EG for each voice) to behave when multiple overlapping notes are played without being released. (In this case, C, F# then B).

Note how previously-played (but still held down) notes remain "in the background" when subsequent notes are hit. This is broadly similar to the behaviour we would expect if the same thing were played on (e.g.) a piano.

==== Paraphonic synthesizer ====
The above can be contrasted with the following recording of how one paraphonic synthesizer (a Korg Volca Keys) actually handles the same situation in real life.

The first note (C) briefly peaks at a high volume ("Attack") when hit, then fades to a quieter level ("Sustain") as the key remains held down (in accordance with ADSR settings).

When the second note (F#) is played, it similarly comes in at full attack volume. However, due to the envelope generator being shared with the voice playing the (still held-down) C, it is forced to do the same. The 'C' returns to full volume simultaneously, giving the false impression it had been hit again.

When the third note (B) is played, a similar situation occurs. The previously-held C and F# return to full "attack" volume alongside, giving the false impression all three notes were hit simultaneously in a chord-like manner.

(While this demonstrates how the Volca Keys chooses to handle paraphony, other methods for doing so are also possible).

== Paraphony in electronic music - history, reinterpretation and generalisation of the term ==
=== Introduction by Roland Corporation ===
Completely unrelated to paraphony in its traditional, musical-consonance sense is the commercial sales term coined by Roland Corporation for their GR-500 "Paraphonic Guitar Synthesizer" released in 1977 (continued in 1978 with the Roland RS-505 "Paraphonic String Synthesizer"). Here, Roland were drawing attention to the ability of the synthesizer to produce distinct sounds 'in parallel', whereby each note played can produce multiple complete tuned sounds simultaneously. The instruction-manual introduced the term to customers, as follows: "The five separate sections... are the Guitar, Polyensemble, Bass, Solo Melody, and External Synthesizer Section... Each of the five sections may be played individually or in any combination... Roland has created a name for this new level of performance capability. It is the word "paraphonic," derived from "parallel" plus "phonic."

RolandCorp US wrote, in 1978 sales literature, "It is Roland's new GR-500 Guitar Synthesizer...both paraphonic and polyphonic. Polyphonic because full chords can be synthesized. Paraphonic because all five sections may be played at once."

=== Reinterpretation of Roland's marketing term for the new millennium ===
This does not explain how that 'new (commercial) meaning' of "paraphony" that in the context of electronic music instruments in 1977 has been turned around significantly into the 21st century from multiple complete polyphonic and monophonic sounds that can be layered in unison to a modern reinterpretation that focuses only on the ability of an electronic musical instrument to generate more than one note-frequency but with the inability to offer individual articulation of tone and/or loudness to each of the individual overlapping notes.

The root of that misconception has been anecdotally attributed to probably the Sound on Sound ("SOS") magazine article, "Introducing Polyphony" (part of its "Synth Secrets" series of articles) published for December, 2000. In this article, musician-writer Gordon Reid (seemingly incorrectly) identifies paraphony thus: "...a form of sound generation called 'Paraphonic' synthesis, prevalent in the late '70s and early '80s... why isn't 'paraphony' (if there is such a word) the same as polyphony? The answer to this is obvious if we consider the articulation of individual notes played on the instrument...", which Reid illustrates with a diagram of a synthesiser with polyphonic initial sound-generation (a divide-down multiple-oscillator and multiple-amplifier architecture) that is, in turn, fed through a single filter and secondary amplifier arrangement.

This was revisited in the following month's continuation of the "Synth Secrets" series where 'paraphony' was compared to polyphony in the context of synthesizers: "Figure 1 (above) shows the architecture of a 'divide-down' paraphonic synth on which only the first note played benefits fully from the Attack and Decay stages of the contour generator, and only the last note benefits from the Release. Figure 2 (above) depicts a fully polyphonic 'divide-down' synthesizer — such as the Polymoog — that offers a VCF/VCA/EG 'articulator' board for every note on the keyboard."

This is a significantly different (re)interpretation of Roland's 'parallel sound' paraphonic term where, instead of being the positive description of multiple simultaneous sounds from a single input, it has turned around to be a somewhat negative description of instruments that cannot 'fully articulate' their polyphony, where each note shares a significant part of its sound creation (or its contouring) process with any and all other overlapping notes.

In fact, Reid was quite correct in what he described, in that instruments described by Roland as offering this 'parallel sound' paraphonic ability had offered layered combinations of sounds comprising individual sounds and voice-architectures that, where electronically generated, did indeed conform to his description. (Roland's first 'paraphonic' device, the GR-500 "Paraphonic Guitar Synthesizer", counted the original guitar sound amongst its 'parallel sounds', which does not necessarily conform to the interpretation). Those articles did, however, seem to apply the term to any electronic musical instrument with this 'single route' voice architecture limitation, as opposed to Roland's definition of the actual stacking of different sounds into one, multi-composite sound. Interestingly, the recent 'redefinition' has become the prevailing popular meaning of "paraphonic" or "paraphony" in modern music technology terms.

=== Multiple interpretations ===
Due to reinterpretations or misinterpretations of what paraphony may actually mean, many musicians (and some instrument-manufacturers) have remained with or returned to using such terms as duophonic and polyphonic to describe their two-note (such as modern reiterations of ARP's Odyssey) or multi-note instruments (such as Behringer's Poly D) - regardless of the multiplicity of any sound-architecture that follows oscillators or the like - simply for a more-meaningful and more-descriptive, terse description of the instrument's note-generation capability and irrespective of the separation (or not) of tone and/or volume, per-note. Meanwhile, the term, 'paraphony' is seldom (or never) applied to the instrument architecture for which Roland spawned the term, which would now, in more-modern parlance, include any 'multitimbral' synthesizer able to output multiple layered sounds simultaneously when triggered by the same input notes.

This leaves us with a multiple interpretations of paraphony that are described in the following table, showing the three meanings of the term "paraphony". Meaning '1' still stands as what would be termed its 'official' and long-standing meaning, whereas meaning '2' was applied by Roland Corporation presenting a 'sales-speak' word that actually already existed. Meaning '3' would seem to be a reinterpretation - possibly a misinterpretation - of meaning '2' and its use has since become widespread. Meaning '3' has prevailed, effectively deprecating meaning '2'.

The term, "Paraphony"
	Source	Origin	Meaning
1	Ancient Greek	trad.	musical consonance relying upon intervals of fifths or fourths
2	Roland Corporation, c.1977	marketing term, independent of meaning 1, a portmanteau of parallel (side by side) and phony (of sound or voice)	the ability of electronic musical instrument to simultaneously produce and layer different sounds triggered and pitched by a single input-source
3	unknown, possibly Sound on Sound magazine, Dec'2000	assumed originally a misinterpretation or a latter-day generalisation of the underlying sound architecture commensurate with meaning 2	the inability of an electronic musical instrument's voice architecture to simultaneously fully-articulate the tone and/or loudness of individual overlapping notes, polyphonically
