= Reticon =

The Reticon Corporation was incorporated in January 1971 in Sunnyvale CA. It is one of several semiconductor companies formed in the '60s and '70s by former employees of Fairchild Semiconductor. Intel, another one of these companies, was an early investor, holding a 22% share in the company.

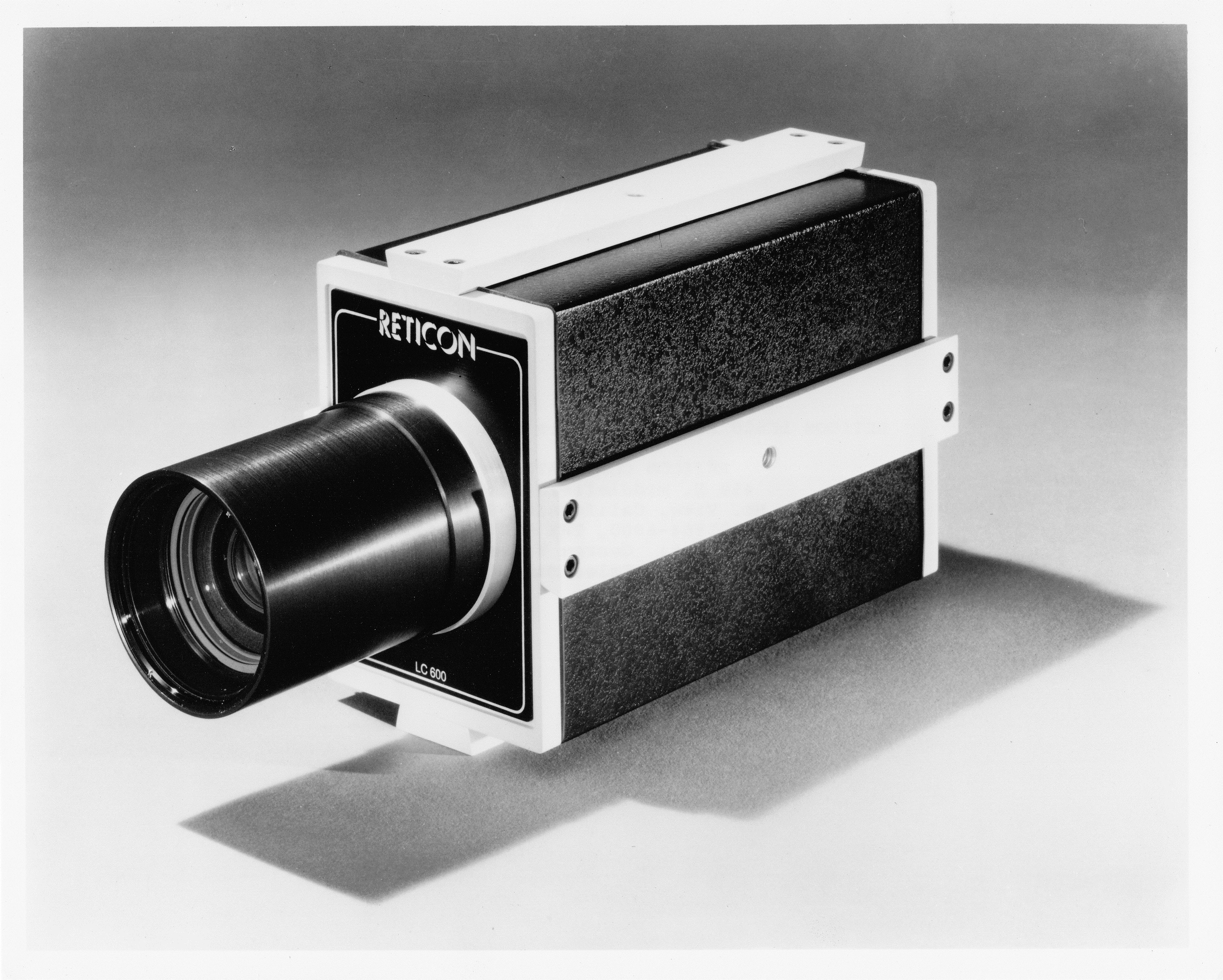
Reticon LC600: Early digital camera (1974) with linear photodiode sensor array of from 64 to 1024 elements. Used for noncontact measurements, process control, and position measurements in industrial applications.

Co-founder Gene Weckler started Reticon after several years at Shockley and eight years at Fairchild Semiconductor. He served as VP from 1971 until 1997. He states that Reticon developed and marketed the first solid state imaging devices, the first digital imaging cameras, and the first computer-controlled vision systems marketed in the USA. They also introduced the first commercially available switched-capacitor filters, and a variety of discrete-time analog signal processing. Other founders included Ed Snow and John Rado.

The company is known as a pioneer in certain technologies including the BBD (bucket-brigade device) and CCD (charge-coupled device). This included creation of such integrated circuits as the SAD512, SAD1024, SAD4096, R5101 and R5601. These were popularly used by companies such as MXR, Boss Corporation, Electro-Harmonix, A/DA and others in various electric guitar effects such as analog delay, chorus and flanging devices through the 1970s and 1980s. Reticon also made very steep analog filters useful for audio measurement.

In 1977, EG&G bought Reticon.

In June 1999, EG&G purchased Perkin-Elmer Analytical Instruments for $425 million. Reticon then became part of the new Optoelectronics division.

Weckler went on to form Rad-icon Imaging Corporation in 1997, where he continued to work in semiretirement until 2009.

The former Reticon group was shuttered by PerkinElmer in the mid 2000s, with some employees and assets transferring into the Amorphous Silicon division. PerkinElmer Optoelectronics was then spun off into Excelitas Technologies.
