= Herbert E. Grier =

American electrical engineer (1911–1999)

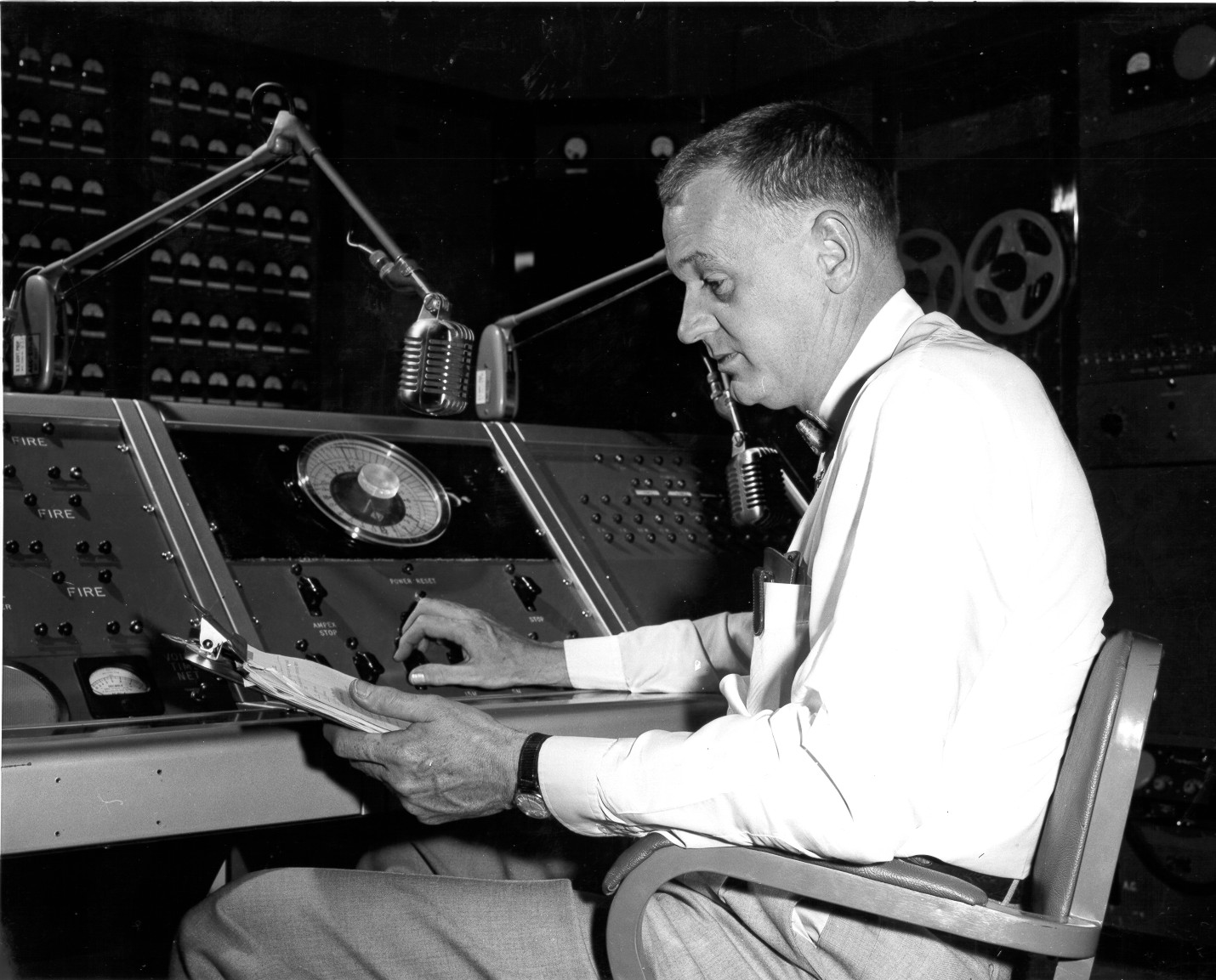
- Grier at the firing console during Operation Plumbbob in 1957
- Born: Herbert Earl Grier; July 3, 1911; Chicago, Illinois, U.S.
- Died: March 17, 1999 (aged 87); La Jolla, California, U.S.
- Education: Massachusetts Institute of Technology
- Occupation: Electrical engineer
- Awards: NASA Distinguished Service Medal (1985); National Medal of Science (1989)

Herbert Earl Grier (July 3, 1911 — March 17, 1999) was an American electrical engineer. While starting his engineering career with the Massachusetts Institute of Technology during the 1930s to 1940s, Grier co-invented a miniature stroboscope and handheld flash with Harold Edgerton and Kenneth Germeshausen. During World War II, Grier built a firing mechanism during the Manhattan Project that was used in the Fat Man bomb.

After he, Edgerton and Germeshausen created EG&G in 1947, Grier was involved in several nuclear tests including Operation Sandstone and Operation Ranger. With EG&G, Grier was president until 1976 and served as a consultant from 1983 to 1994. Apart from electrical engineering, he took part in NASA safety boards that assessed Skylab and the preparation of the first Space Shuttle. Grier was awarded the NASA Distinguished Service Medal in 1985 and the National Medal of Science in 1989.

== Early life and education ==
Grier was born on July 3, 1911, in Chicago, Illinois. At the age of eleven, Grier and his family left Chicago to live in New York City. For his post-secondary education, Grier graduated with a Bachelor of Science and Master of Science from the Massachusetts Institute of Technology in the early 1930s.

== Career ==
Grier started his career as an electrical engineer for MIT from 1934 to 1947. During this time period, Grier co-invented a miniature stroboscope alongside Harold Edgerton and Kenneth Germeshausen in 1934. Years later, Grier and his colleagues created a Kodak handheld flash for newspaper photographers in 1940. While working on aerial photography for Edgerton during World War II, Grier joined the Manhattan Project and built the firing mechanism used in the Fat Man bomb.

After forming EG&G with Edgerton and Germeshausen in 1947, Grier was involved in nuclear tests between the late 1940s and early 1950s. These included Operation Sandstone, Operation Ranger and Operation Ivy. With EG&G, Grier was the company's president until 1976 and was a consultant from 1983 to 1994. Other executive roles Grier had were president of CER Geonuclear Company from 1965 to 1983 and chairman of Reynolds Electrical & Engineering Company from 1969 to 1971. Outside of electrical engineering, Grier was selected for a 1973 NASA advisory board on safety that reviewed Skylab. He also led a 1980 safety committee that assessed the preparation of the first NASA Space Shuttle.

== Awards and honors ==
Grier was a recipient of the NASA Distinguished Service Medal in 1985 and the National Medal of Science in 1989.

== Personal life ==
Grier died on March 17, 1999, in La Jolla, California. He was married and had three children.
