= Bucket brigade =

Method for transporting items

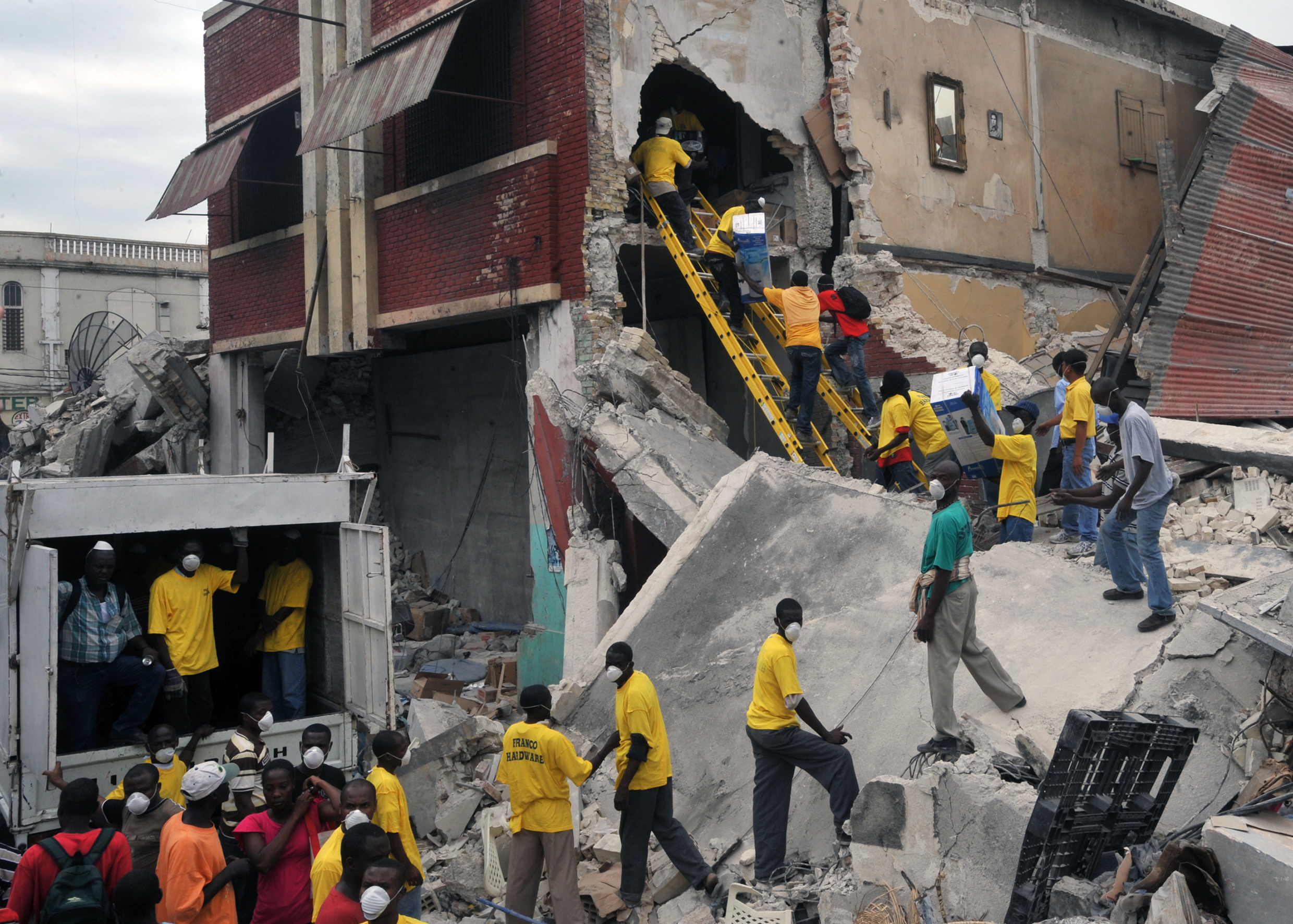
A human chain empties a warehouse after the 2010 Haiti earthquake.

A bucket brigade or human chain is a method for transporting items where items are passed from one (relatively stationary) person to the next.

The method was important in firefighting before the advent of hand-pumped fire engines, whereby firefighters would pass buckets of water to each other to extinguish a blaze. This technique is still common where using machines to move water, supplies, or other items would be impractical. This method needs a number of participants sufficient for covering the distance. The technique is a commonly used strategy where disaster relief is necessary, such as in the 2010 Haiti earthquake, and during the recover efforts in the wake of the September 11 attacks.

== As a metaphor ==
This principle inspired various technical items, e.g. the bucket-brigade device.

The term "bucket brigade" is also used for a certain method of organizing manual order picking in distribution centers. Here, customer orders to be processed are passed from one order picker to the next. When the last picker in line has finished picking an order, they walk back and take over the work of the next-to-last picker, who in their turn also walk back and so on, until the first person in line is reached, who then commences picking an entirely new order.

Similar applications of the idea of bucket brigades also exist for production lines.

== See also ==
- Electron transport chain
- Chain gang
- Pipelining
