= Korg Poly-800 =

Polyphonic synthesizer

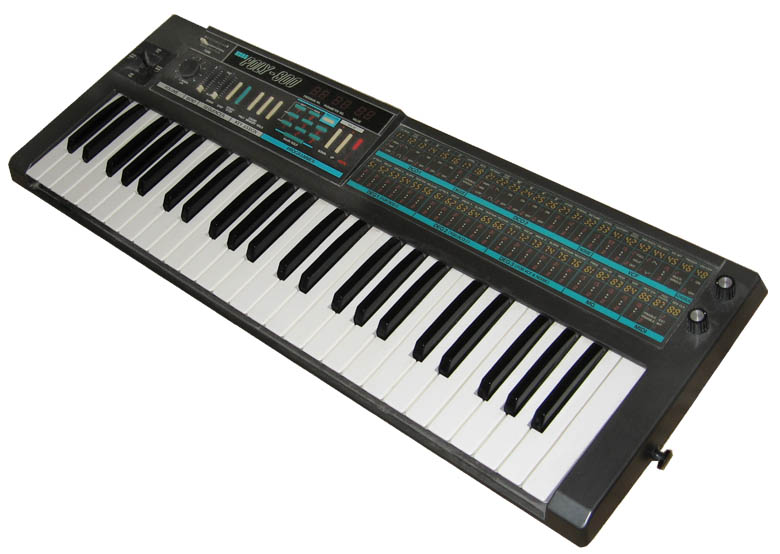
- Korg Poly-800 with filter modification
- Manufacturer: Korg
- Dates: 1983 - 1987
- Price: $795

Technical specifications
- Polyphony: 8 or 4 voices
- Timbrality: Monotimbral
- Oscillator: 1 or 2 DCOs per voice
- LFO: 1 triangle
- Synthesis type: Analog Subtractive
- Filter: 1 resonant low-pass
- Attenuator: 3 ADBSSR
- Storage memory: 64 patches
- Effects: Chorus
- Hardware: Oki MSM5232

Input/output
- Keyboard: 49 keys
- Left-hand control: Joystick
- External control: MIDI

The Korg Poly-800 is an 8-voice analog synthesizer released by Korg in 1983. Its initial list price of $795 made it the first fully programmable polyphonic synthesizer that sold for less than $1,000. It was designed for portability, featuring battery power and a lightweight design that allowed the user to play with it strapped around their neck. It utilized digitally controlled oscillators (DCOs), and was a paraphonic synth with a single filter shared between its eight voices.

== Sounds and features ==
Each DCO offers sawtooth and square waveforms, which are mixed together with a white noise generator before being sent to a voltage-controlled filter (VCF). The Poly-800 features 2 polyphony modes: Whole mode offers 8-voice polyphony with one DCO per voice, while Double mode places the DCOs in pairs for a richer sound, albeit at the expense of reducing polyphony to four voices. The VCF is shared across all voices, which means the Poly-800 is technically a paraphonic synth, instead of a polyphonic synth. The filter can be set to either single or multiple trigger modes; in single mode, the envelope is triggered by the first key press and won't re-trigger until all keys are released. Multi mode allows each key press to trigger the filter envelope independently.

Each DCO features a digital envelope generator (DEG) to control its own volume. These DEGs have six stages: Attack, Decay, Break Point, Slope, Sustain, Release (ADBSSR). This offers advanced modulation possibilities such as two-stage decay or a secondary attack phase. The DEGs have a slight 'stepped' effect on slow attacks, which can add nuance to sounds such as flutes.

The low-frequency oscillator (LFO) features a triangle wave that can be controlled with a joystick and features an optional delay for fading modulation in after playing a note. The joystick can be shifted upwards to modulate the DCO (creating vibrato effects), downwards to modulate the VCF, and side to side for altering the pitch bend. The Poly-800 features a 49-key non-velocity-sensitive keyboard and a built-in 256-step polyphonic step sequencer.

Although it includes MIDI capabilities, it lacks MIDI System Exclusive (SysEx) functionality, with the exception of the expander version, the EX800, or through modification of the Poly-800 with an EX-firmware-ROM. Patch backup is performed via cassette tape. Early models of the Poly-800 required batteries to retain settings, with sounds and sequences being lost if the instrument was left without batteries, resulting in the synth powering up in a random state. To safeguard data, sounds and sequences could be saved and loaded via cassette, or as WAV or MP3 files.

The Poly-800 could operate on batteries and included guitar strap pegs for mobility, allowing performers to wear it similarly to a guitar. A variant with reversed-colored keys emulated the look of a Vox Continental organ.

The Poly-800 uses the Oki MSM5232 sound chip, which helped make the synthesizer more affordable. The MSM5232 sound chip was also used for chiptune video game music in various arcade video games during the 1980s, especially Taito games.

== Variants ==
In 1984, Korg introduced the EX-800, a keyboardless, rack-mountable version of the Poly-800, which included limited MIDI System Exclusive (SysEx) capability. The EX-800 could also be paired with a Poly-800 through MIDI to increase polyphony.

In 1986, Korg introduced the Poly-800 II, an updated version that swapped the original's chorus effect for a digital delay with adjustable modulation, as well as a new colour scheme. The Poly-800 II also incorporated MIDI System Exclusive (SysEx) functionality, a programmable equalizer with high/low settings, program backups via MIDI in conjunction with the existing cassette interface, and expanded the sequencer's memory capacity to 1000 events.

In 2020, Full Bucket Music released a free software emulation of the Poly-800, called Fury-800.

== Reception ==
At the time of its release, critics were not impressed with the Poly-800's single VCF, its very basic settings, including parameters with as few as four steps that would typically be adjusted smoothly with knobs, and its somewhat restricted sound abilities. However, these aspects did not significantly detract from its popularity among users; the synthesizer became renowned for its distinctive joystick, optional reverse-color keyboard and strap pegs, allowing it to be played as a keytar.

The Poly-800 was the subject of numerous DIY enhancements and circuit-bending modifications. These include adding filter cutoff and resonance knobs, along with a switch to alternate the filter response between 4-pole and 2-pole, which was facilitated by the synthesizer's filter chip including a 2-pole output that was not utilized by default.
