= Tactical Control System =

The Tactical Control System (TCS) is a group of protocols that govern the command and control system for unmanned aerial vehicles (UAVs).

== History ==
Developed by EG&G Technical Services and Raytheon, starting in 1999, the Tactical Control System is designed to run UAVs in all branches of the United States military as well as NATO STANAG 4586 compliant UAVs. Raytheon developed the systems to run on computers using a type of Unix operating system called Solaris 8 from Sun Microsystems. Raytheon also developed a system for the Linux operating system.

According to the winning Raytheon bid for the development of the TCS system, it will feature:

- Simultaneous control of multiple UAVs
- Compliance with NATO's Standardization Agreement 4586
- Integration of plug and play payloads
- Weaponization of the Fire Scout and Fire Scout operational evaluations

== Testing ==
Raytheon was to undergo formal Operational Evaluation with Fire Scout in Fiscal Year 2008. Until then, tests to determine the progress of the system's development were ongoing. Positive results included:

- December 2004 - A scaled down laptop version of TCS, the Multiple Vehicle Control System (MVCS), was able to control two UAVs flying over Arizona simultaneously. The MVCS was also able to simultaneously control an unmanned surface vessel operating on Chesapeake Bay near Norfolk, Virginia.
- January 2005 - The TCS system was able to complete a vertical shipboard landing on a moving target, the US Navy ship USS Nashville, independent of any pilot. This was the first time such a feat had ever been achieved.
- April 10, 2006 - Raytheon Company successfully simulated simultaneous command and control of two unmanned air vehicles (UAV) and an unmanned surface vehicle from one common control system.
