= Denis d'or =

First musical instrument involving electricity

The Denis d'or (lit. 'Golden Dionysus') was reportedly the first musical instrument in history that involved electricity.

== Background ==
The Czech theologian Václav Prokop Diviš, who had his parish in the Moravian town Přímětice near Znojmo, was interested in both music and electricity. He studied the use of electricity first for medical and agrarian purposes, and later for the prevention of thunderstorms. He also tried to apply it to music when he created his own musical instrument that he named "Denis d'or", with the French "Denis" (etymologically going back to "Dionysus"), whose Czech counterpart is "Diviš"—hence the name.

The earliest written mention of the Denis d'or dates from 1753, but it is likely that it already existed around 1748. Some sources even date its existence as far back as the year 1730, but this claim is historically untenable and not supported by any available information on Diviš's biography and work. Unfortunately, after Diviš's death in 1765 the unique instrument was sold and eventually brought to Vienna, where it vanished without a trace.

Surviving descriptions of the Denis d'or are short and very few, so that it is not even possible to clarify whether it was truly an electrophone or not. Diviš has been called the first person to foster the idea of an aesthetic connection between music and electricity. However, Jean-Baptiste Thillaie Delaborde built the clavecin électrique a few years later, an instrument that is much better documented.

== Properties of the instrument ==
The Denis d'or was reported to have 14 registers, most of which were twofold, and its complex mechanism fitted in a symmetrical wooden cabinet equipped with a keyboard and a pedal. It was about 150 cm (4.9 ft) long, 90 cm (3.0 ft) wide, and 120 cm (3.9 ft) high. Basically, it was a chordophone not unlike a clavichord—in other words, the strings were struck, not plucked. The suspension and the tautening of the allegedly 790 metal strings was described as more elaborate than a clavichord. The mechanism which had been worked out by Diviš was such that the Denis d’or could imitate the sounds of a variety of other instruments, including chordophones such as harpsichords, harps, lutes and wind instruments. This was mainly owing to the responsiveness and combinability of the stops, which permitted the player to vary the sound in multiple ways, thereby generating far more than a hundred different tonal voices altogether.

Finally, the novelty instrument produced electric shocks as practical jokes on the player. When the German theologian Johann Ludwig Fricker (1729–1766) visited Diviš in 1753 and saw the Denis d'or with his own eyes, he referred to it in a journal of the University of Tübingen as an "Electrisch-Musicalische[s] Instrument"—the literal translation of which is "electric musical instrument".

It is disputed whether the Denis d'or sounds were also produced by electricity or if it was an otherwise acoustical instrument like the clavichord. Allegedly, Diviš could charge the iron strings with electricity in order to enhance the sound quality. This would be a possible explanation for effects that the audience perceived as electric in nature and might have been achieved with Leyden jars or similar equipment commonly used in early research on electricity.
