= Jean-Baptiste Thillaie Delaborde =

French Jesuit and scientist (1730–1777)

Jean-Baptiste Thillais Delaborde (De Laborde, De La Borde, also Thillais and Thillaès) (9 June 1730 – late January 1777) was a French physical scientist, mathematician and Jesuit priest. He was born in Nevers and began his novitiate in the Society of Jesus on 26 September 1745. Around 1755 he was teaching rhetoric in Amiens. He passed the third year of his novitiate in 1762 at Rouen. He spent a number of years in Poznań, then moved to La Collancelle where he served as a priest until his death.

He was the author of the book titled Le Clavessin électrique avec une nouvelle théorie du méchanisme et des phénomènes de l'électricité (Paris, 1761) in which he described the second earliest electric musical instrument—the clavecin électrique. Delaborde built a working model of his innovative instrument and organized performances, however, even though the press was sympathetic to the clavecin électrique, it was never developed further and was soon forgotten. The original model built by Delaborde survives and is kept at the Bibliothèque nationale in Paris.
