= Roland RS-202 =

Polyphonic string synthesizer

The Roland RS-202 was a polyphonic combined digital/analog string synthesizer, introduced by Roland in 1976. It was the successor to the Roland RS-101, released in 1975.

The synthesizer operated using sawtooth wave oscillators, which used a frequency divider in a similar manner to an electronic organ to provide full polyphony across a five-octave keyboard. The signal was then fed through a single envelope shaper, making the instrument paraphonic. The front panel had two separate controls for the top and bottom of the keyboard, which could have independent sounds. Each note could be assigned a separate envelope articulation, which was necessary to avoid re-triggering the attack if an extra note was added to an existing chord being played. To achieve a more realistic sound of an ensemble of string players, the output was fed through a chorus effect using a number of analog delay lines triggered by low frequency oscillators.

An American company called Multivox manufactured a clone of the RS-202, called the MX-202. It used similar internal components, though the sound was weaker.

Notable users of the RS-202 include Genesis' Tony Banks, Camel's Peter Bardens, Los Bukis and Tomita.

== See also ==
- ARP String Synthesizer
