= String synthesizer =

Type of synthesizer

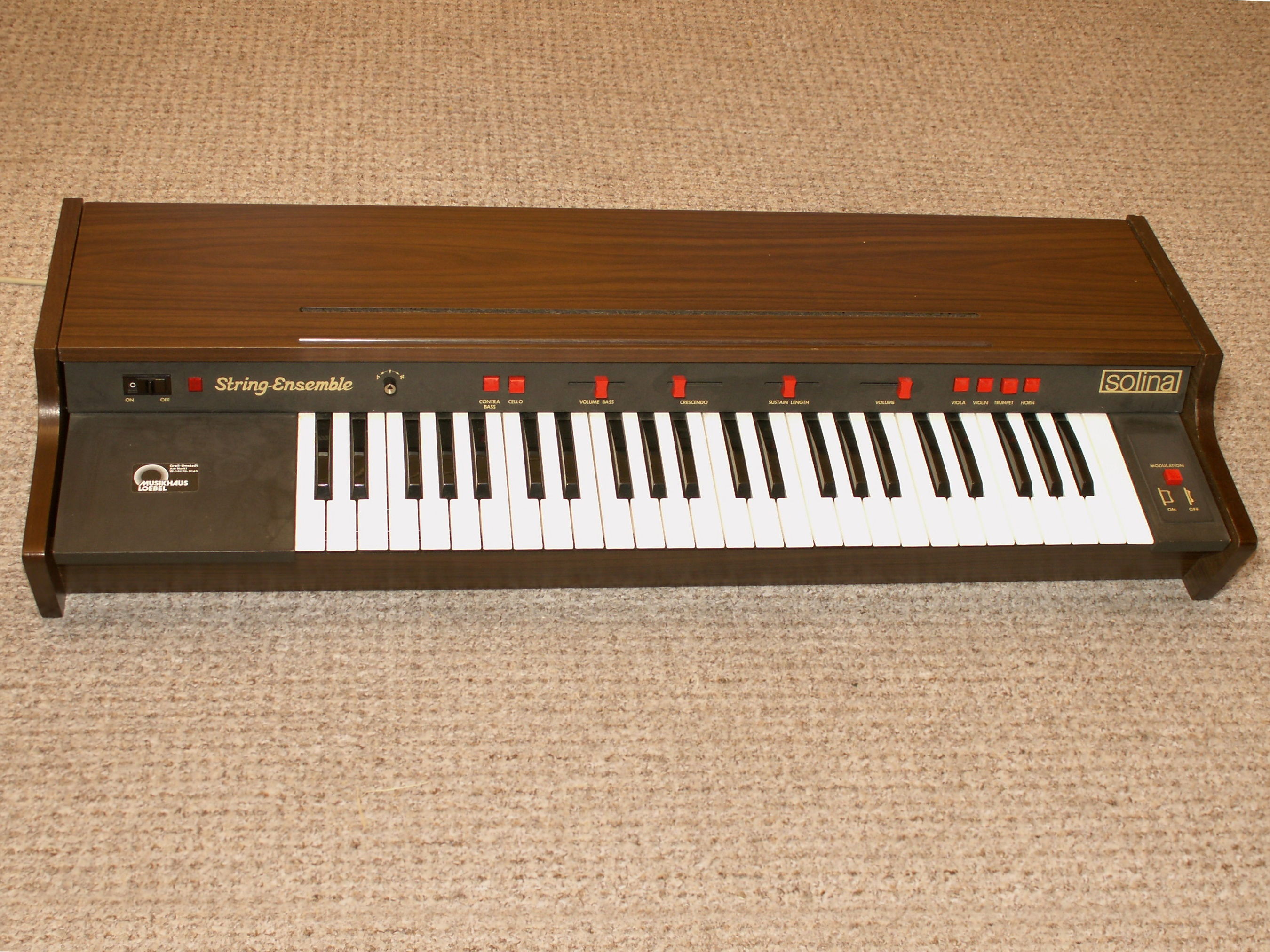
The Solina String Ensemble, an early string synthesizer

A string synthesizer or string machine is a synthesizer designed to make sounds similar to those of a string section. Dedicated string synthesizers occupied a specific musical instrument niche between electronic organs and general-purpose synthesizers in the 1970s and early 1980s, until advances in digital signal processing technology allowed the production of inexpensive general-purpose polyphonic synthesizers and samplers, which made the existence of a separate type of instrument unnecessary.

The development of the string synthesizer was originally motivated by the need for a cheaper and more portable alternative to the Mellotron, which was itself a cheaper alternative to human string ensembles. The availability of string synthesizers was influential in adding string orchestration to popular music that would not otherwise be able to afford the use of a human string ensemble, and their characteristic sound, which was almost, but not quite, like that of a real string ensemble, was one of the distinguishing sounds of the era.

To keep costs down, string synthesizers typically used a frequency divider architecture similar to that of electronic organs, with the addition of specialized in-built vibrato and chorus effects to mimic the ensemble effect of multiple string instruments playing at once. Classic string synthesizers included the Freeman String Symphonizer, Eminent 310, Logan String Melody, Roland RS-101, Roland RS-202, Korg Polyphonic Ensemble S, Crumar Orchestrator (Multiman-S), Elka Rhapsody, ARP String Ensemble, Moog Opus 3 and the Vox String Thing (a rebranded version of the budget Jen SM2007 String Machine) and the Roland VP-330.

== See also ==
- Mellotron, an analog tape-replay keyboard also used to imitate string ensembles
