= Bucket-brigade device =

Network in mathematical dynamics

A bucket brigade or bucket-brigade device (BBD) is a discrete-time analogue delay line, developed in 1969 by F. Sangster and K. Teer of the Philips Research Labs in the Netherlands. It consists of a series of capacitance sections C_{0} to C_{n}. The stored analogue signal is moved along the line of capacitors, one step at each clock cycle. The name comes from analogy with the term bucket brigade, used for a line of people passing buckets of water.

In most signal processing applications, bucket brigades have been replaced by devices that use digital signal processing, manipulating samples in digital form. Bucket brigades still see use in specialty applications, such as guitar effects.

A well-known integrated circuit device around 1976, the Reticon SAD-1024 implemented two 512-stage analog delay lines in a 16-pin DIP. It allowed clock frequencies ranging from 1.5 kHz to more than 1.5 MHz. The SAD-512 was a single delay line version. The Philips Semiconductors TDA1022 similarly offered a 512-stage delay line but with a clock rate range of 5–500 kHz. Other common BBD chips include the Panasonic MN3002, MN3005, MN3007, MN3204 and MN3205, with the primary differences being the available delay time. Some examples effects units utilizing Panasonic BBDs are the Boss CE-1 Chorus Ensemble and the Yamaha E1010.

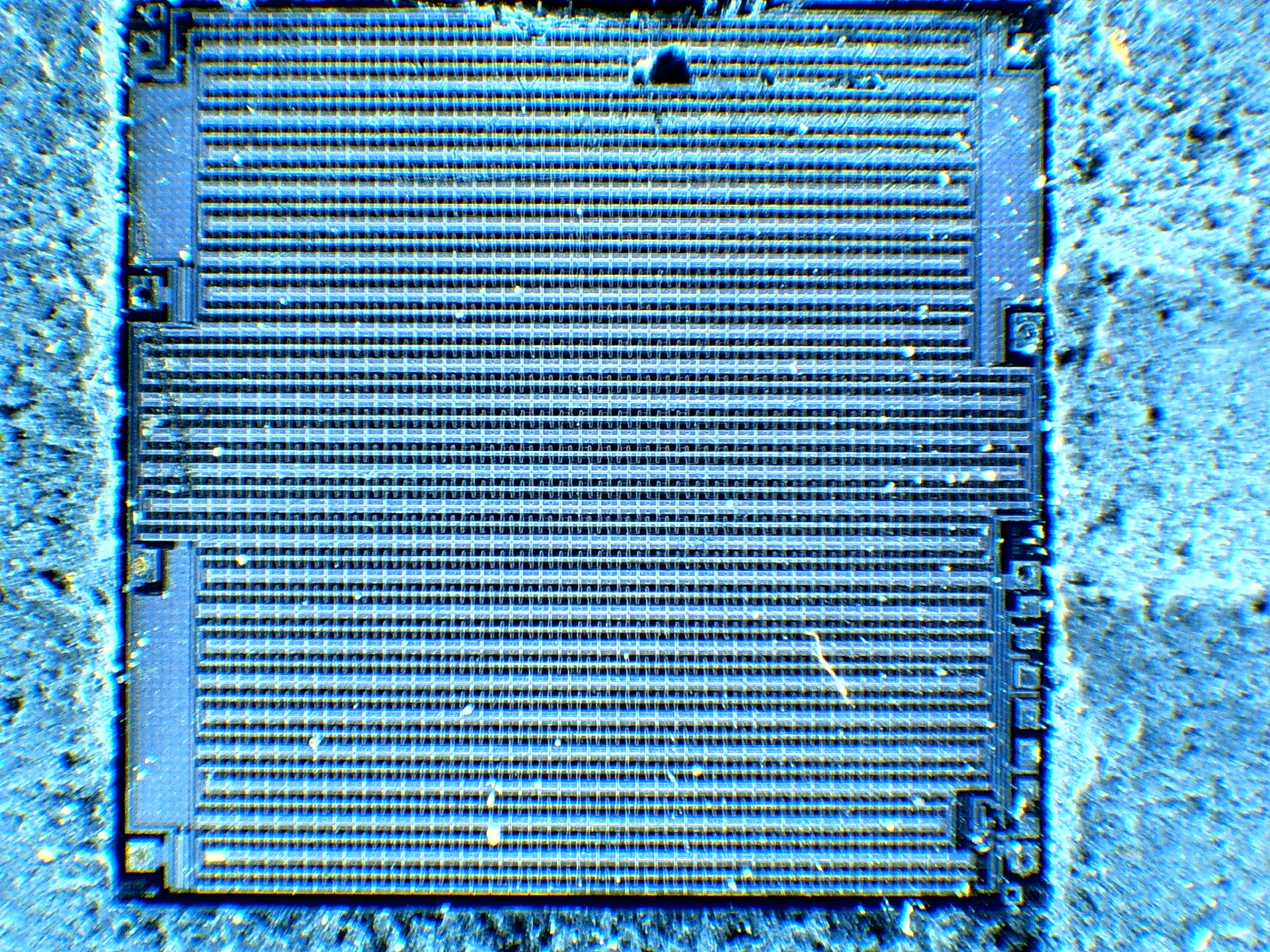
MN-3208 decapped die

In 2009, the guitar effects pedal manufacturer Visual Sound recommissioned production of the Panasonic-designed MN3102 and MN3207 BBD chip. The MN3208 (sometimes stylized as MN-3208) is a vintage 8-pin DIP (Dual In-line Package) integrated circuit from Panasonic (formerly Matsushita), introduced in the 1970s–1980s. It's a low-noise Bucket Brigade Device (BBD) designed for analog audio delay effects, such as chorus, flanger, vibrato, and echo in guitar pedals, synthesizers, and portable audio equipment. Specifically, it's a 2048-stage BBD, meaning it uses 2048 discrete "stages" (capacitor-transistor pairs) to sample and shift an analog signal, creating delays up to ~102 ms at a 10 kHz clock rate (down to ~2 ms at 500 kHz). It operates on low voltage (4–10 V, typically 5–9 V for pedal use) and boasts a high signal-to-noise ratio (~71 dB) with low insertion loss (~0 dB typical) and total harmonic distortion (~0.8% at 1 kHz).

Despite being analog in their representation of individual signal voltage samples, these devices are discrete in the time domain and thus are limited by the Nyquist–Shannon sampling theorem; both the input and output signals are generally low-pass filtered. The input must be low-pass filtered to avoid aliasing effects, while the output is low-pass filtered for reconstruction. (A low-pass is used as an approximation to the Whittaker–Shannon interpolation formula.)

Charge transfer in a three-phase charge-coupled device

The BBD shares a principle similar to the charge-coupled device (CCD), which was invented by Bell Labs for use in digital cameras. However, the idea of using capacitors to retain a voltage state has older origins than both BBD and CCD; dynamic random-access memory, invented by the American Robert H. Dennard in 1966, also uses capacitors to store charges, but these charges are not propagated, but refreshed, in place.

== See also ==
- Switched capacitor
