= High-speed photography =

Photography genre

Muybridge's photographic sequence of a race horse galloping, first published in 1878

High-speed photography is the science of taking pictures of very fast phenomena. In 1948, the Society of Motion Picture and Television Engineers (SMPTE) defined high-speed photography as any set of photographs captured by a camera capable of 69 frames per second or greater, and of at least three consecutive frames. High-speed photography can be considered to be the opposite of time-lapse photography.

In common usage, high-speed photography may refer to either or both of the following meanings. The first is that the photograph itself may be taken in a way as to appear to freeze the motion, especially to reduce motion blur. The second is that a series of photographs may be taken at a high sampling frequency or frame rate. The first requires a sensor with good sensitivity and either a very good shuttering system or a very fast strobe light. The second requires some means of capturing successive frames, either with a mechanical device or by moving data off electronic sensors very quickly.

Other considerations for high-speed photographers are record length, reciprocity breakdown, and spatial resolution.

== Early applications and development ==
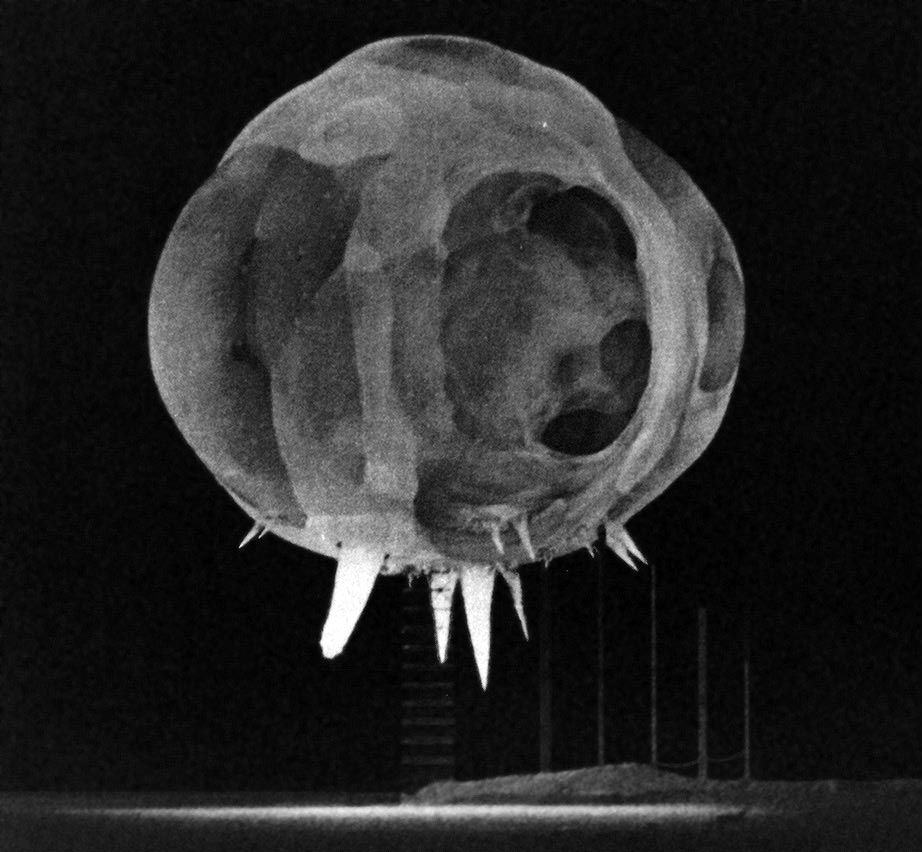
Nuclear explosion photographed by rapatronic camera less than 1 millisecond after detonation. The fireball is about 20 meters in diameter. The spikes at the bottom of the fireball are due to what is known as the rope trick effect.

The first practical application of high-speed photography was Eadweard Muybridge's 1878 investigation into whether horses' feet were actually all off the ground at once during a gallop. The first photograph of a supersonic flying bullet was taken by the Austrian physicist Peter Salcher in Rijeka in 1886, a technique that was later used by Ernst Mach in his studies of supersonic motion. German weapons scientists applied the techniques in 1916, and The Japanese Institute of Aeronautical Research manufactured a camera capable of recording 60,000 frames per second in 1931.

Bell Telephone Laboratories was one of the first customers for a camera developed by Eastman Kodak in the early 1930s. Bell used the system, which ran 16 mm film at 1000 frame/s and had a 100-foot (30 m) load capacity, to study relay bounce. When Kodak declined to develop a higher-speed version, Bell Labs developed it themselves, calling it the Fastax. The Fastax was capable of 5,000 frame/s. Bell eventually sold the camera design to Western Electric, who in turn sold it to the Wollensak Optical Company. Wollensak further improved the design to achieve 10,000 frame/s. Redlake Laboratories introduced another 16 mm rotating prism camera, the Hycam, in the early 1960s. Photo-Sonics developed several models of rotating prism camera capable of running 35 mm and 70 mm film in the 1960s. Visible Solutions introduced the Photec IV 16 mm camera in the 1980s.

In 1940, a patent was filed by Cearcy D. Miller for the rotating mirror camera, theoretically capable of one million frames per second. The first practical application of this idea occurred during the Manhattan Project, when Berlyn Brixner was hired into Los Alamos in July 1943. He joined the Optical Engineering Group led by Professor Julian Ellis Mack. The group assisted in providing optical and camera support within the Manhattan Project. Brixner was also the head photographer for the Trinity test and built the first known fully functional rotating mirror camera. This camera was used to photograph early prototypes of the first nuclear bomb. However, the camera was replaced in 1944 by a faster rotating mirror camera invented by Professor Mack, the Mack Streak Camera.

The D. B. Milliken company developed an intermittent, pin-registered, 16 mm camera for speeds of 400 frame/s in 1957. Mitchell, Redlake Laboratories, and Photo-Sonics eventually followed in the 1960s with a variety of 16, 35, and 70 mm intermittent cameras.

== Stroboscopy and laser applications ==
Harold Edgerton is generally credited with pioneering the use of the stroboscope to freeze fast motion. He eventually helped found EG&G, which used some of Edgerton's methods to capture the physics of explosions required to detonate nuclear weapons. One such device was the EG&G Microflash 549, which is an air-gap flash. Also see the photograph of an explosion using a Rapatronic camera.

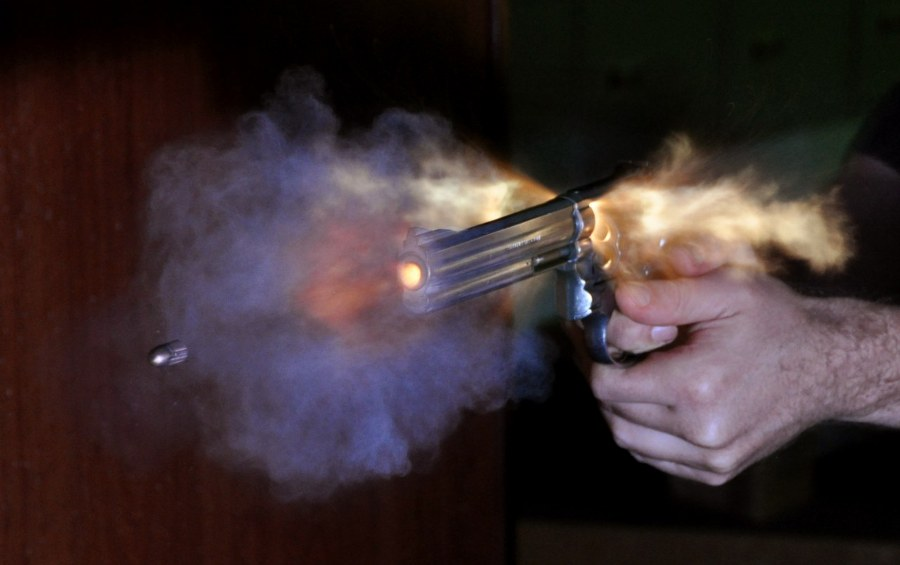
A photo of a Smith & Wesson firing, taken with an air-gap flash. The photo was taken in a darkened room, with camera's shutter open and the flash was triggered by the sound of the shot using a microphone.

Advancing the idea of the stroboscope, researchers began using lasers to stop high-speed motion. Recent advances include the use of High Harmonic Generation to capture images of molecular dynamics down to the scale of the attosecond (10^{−18} s).

== High-speed film cameras ==
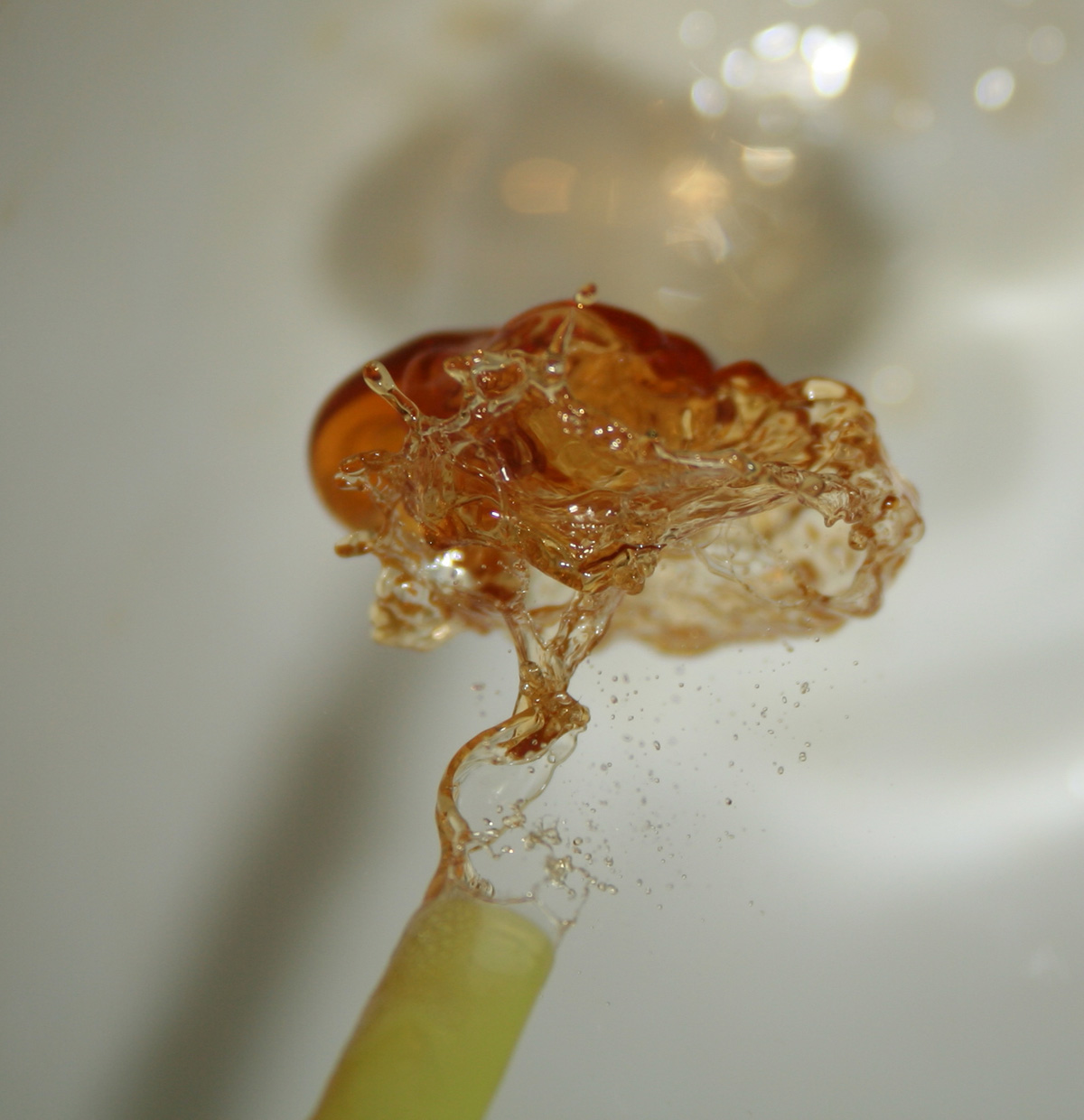
A 5 millisecond capture of coffee blown out of a straw.

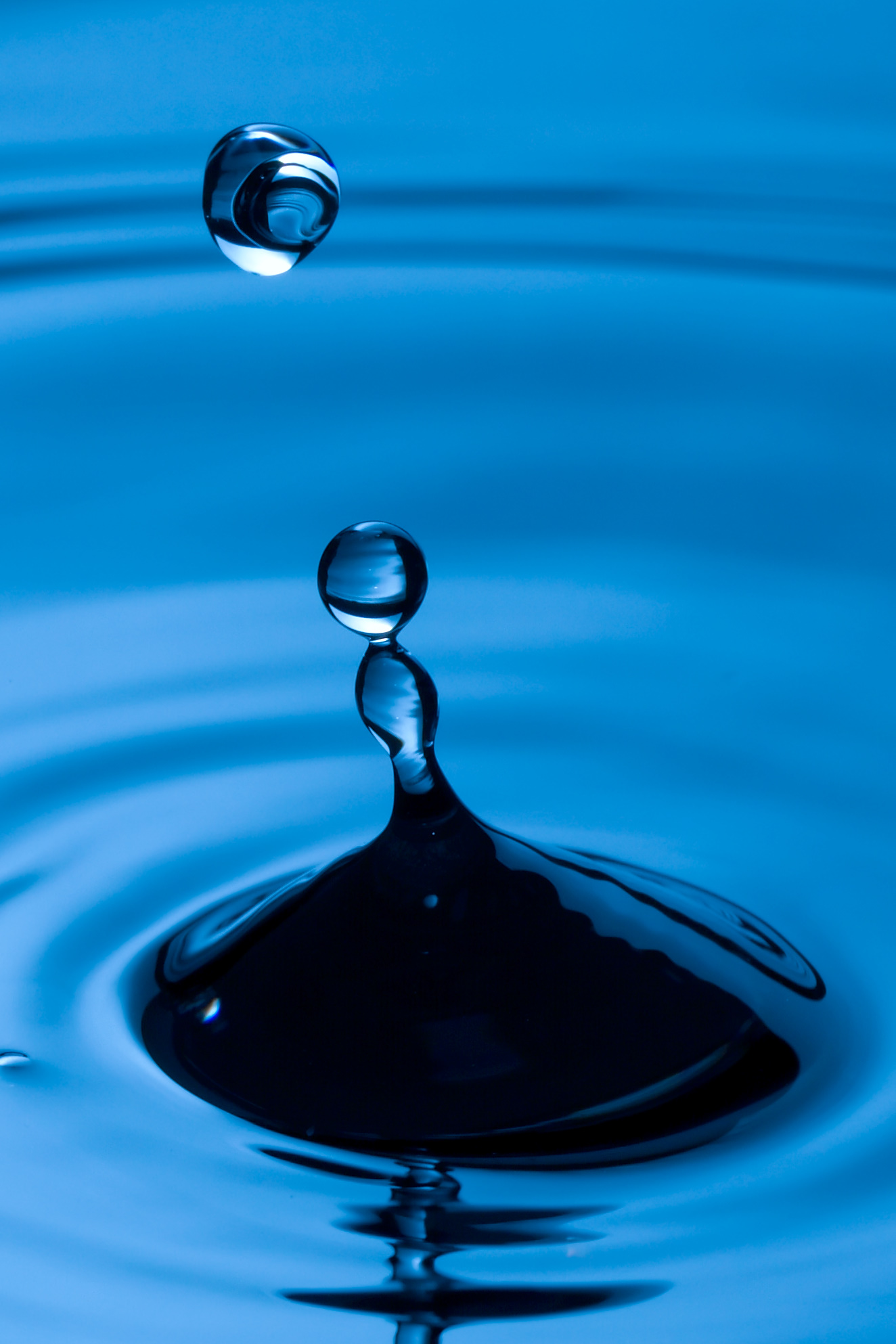
A droplet is caught with a strobe after rebounding upward.

A high-speed camera is defined as having the capability of capturing video at a rate in excess of 250 frames per second. There are many different types of high-speed film cameras, but they can mostly all be grouped into five different categories:

- Intermittent motion cameras, which are a speed-up version of the standard motion picture camera using a sewing machine type mechanism to advance the film intermittently to a fixed exposure point behind the objective lens,
- Rotating prism cameras, which run film continuously past an exposure point and use a rotating prism between the objective lens and the film to impart motion to the image which matches the film motion, thereby canceling it out,
- Rotating mirror cameras, which relay the image through a rotating mirror to an arc of film, and can work in continuous access or synchronous access depending on the design.
- Image dissection cameras, which can use a rotating mirror system, and
- Raster cameras, which record a "chopped up" version of an image.

Intermittent motion cameras are capable of hundreds of frames per second, rotating prism cameras are capable of thousands to millions of frames per second, rotating mirror cameras are capable of millions of frames per second, raster cameras can achieve millions of frames per second, and image dissection cameras are capable of billions of frames per second.

As film and mechanical transports improved, the high-speed film camera became available for scientific research. Kodak eventually shifted its film from acetate base to Estar (Kodak's name for a Mylar-equivalent plastic), which enhanced the strength and allowed it to be pulled faster. The Estar was also more stable than acetate allowing more accurate measurement, and it was not as prone to fire.

Each film type is available in many load sizes. These may be cut down and placed in magazines for easier loading. A 1,200-foot (370 m) magazine is typically the longest available for the 35 mm and 70 mm cameras. A 400-foot (120 m) magazine is typical for 16 mm cameras, though 1,000-foot (300 m) magazines are available. Typically rotary prism cameras use 100 ft (30m) film loads. The images on 35 mm high-speed film are typically more rectangular with the long side between the sprocket holes instead of parallel to the edges as in standard photography. 16 mm and 70 mm images are typically more square rather than rectangular. A list of ANSI formats and sizes is available.

Most cameras use pulsed timing marks along the edge of the film (either inside or outside of the film perforations) produced by sparks or later by LEDs. These allow accurate measurement of the film speed and in the case of streak or smear images, velocity measurement of the subject. These pulses are usually cycled at 10, 100, 1000 Hz depending on the speed setting of the camera.

=== Intermittent pin register ===
Just as with a standard motion picture camera, the intermittent register pin camera actually stops the film in the film gate while the photograph is being taken. In high-speed photography, this requires some modifications to the mechanism for achieving this intermittent motion at such high speeds. In all cases, a loop is formed before and after the gate to create and then take up the slack. Pulldown claws, which enter the film through perforations, pulling it into place and then retracting out of the perforations and out of the film gate, are multiplied to grab the film through multiple perforations in the film, thereby reducing the stress that any individual perforation is subjected to. Register pins, which secure the film through perforations in final position while it is being exposed, after the pulldown claws are retracted are also multiplied, and often made from exotic materials. In some cases, vacuum suction is used to keep the film, especially 35 mm and 70 mm film, flat so that the images are in focus across the entire frame.

- 16 mm pin register: D. B. Milliken Locam, capable of 500 frame/s; the design was eventually sold to Redlake. Photo-Sonics built a 16 mm pin-registered camera that was capable of 1000 frame/s, but they eventually removed it from the market.
- 35 mm pin register: Early cameras included the Mitchell 35 mm. Photo-Sonics won an Academy Award for Technical Achievement for the 4ER in 1988. The 4E is capable of 360 frame/s.
- 70 mm pin register: Cameras include a model made by Hulcher, and Photo-Sonics 10A and 10R cameras, capable of 125 frame/s.

=== Rotary prism ===
The rotary prism camera allowed higher frame rates without placing as much stress on the film or transport mechanism. The film moves continuously past a rotating prism which is synchronized to the main film sprocket such that the speed of the film and the speed of the prism are always running at the same proportional speed. The prism is located between the objective lens and the film, such that the revolution of the prism "paints" a frame onto the film for each face of the prism. Prisms are typically cubic, or four sided, for full frame exposure. Since exposure occurs as the prism rotates, images near the top or bottom of the frame, where the prism is substantially off axis, suffer from significant aberration. A shutter can improve the results by gating the exposure more tightly around the point where the prism faces are nearly parallel.

- 16 mm rotary prism – Redlake Hycam cameras are capable of 11,000 frame/s with a full frame prism (4 facets), 22,000 frame/s with a half-frame kit, and 44,000 frame/s with a quarter-frame kit. Visible Solutions also makes the Photec IV. For a more rugged solution, Weinberger made the Stalex 1B, which frames at up to 3000full frames per second, and had the ability to be mounted on board for car crash testing. Fastax cameras can achieve up to 18,000 frames per second with an 8-sided prism.
- 35 mm rotary prism – Photo-Sonics 4C cameras are capable of 2,500 frame/s with a full frame prism (4 facets), 4,000 frame/s with a half-frame kit, and 8,000 frame/s with a quarter-frame kit.
- 70 mm rotary prism – Photo-Sonics 10B cameras are capable of 360 frame/s with a full frame prism (4 facets), and 720 frame/s with a half-frame kit.

=== Rotating mirror ===
Rotating mirror cameras can be divided into two sub-categories; pure rotating mirror cameras and rotating drum, or Dynafax cameras.

In pure rotating mirror cameras, film is held stationary in an arc centered about a rotating mirror. The basic construction of a rotating mirror camera consists of four parts; a main objective lens, a field lens, image compensation lenses, and a rotating mirror to sequentially expose frames. An image of the object under study is formed in the region of a rotating mirror with flat faces (a trihedral mirror is commonly used because it has a relatively high bursting speed, but designs with eight or more faces have been used). A field lens optically conjugates the pupil of the main objective lens in the region of a bank of compensation lenses, and the final compensation lenses optically conjugate the mirror to the surface of a photodetector. For each frame formed on the film, one compensation lens is required, but some designs have used a series of flat mirrors. As such, these cameras typically do not record more than one hundred frames, but frame counts up to 2000 have been recorded. This means they record for only a very short time – typically less than a millisecond. Therefore, they require specialized timing and illumination equipment. Rotating mirror cameras are capable of up to 25 million frames per second, with typical speed in the millions of fps.

The rotating drum camera works by holding a strip of film in a loop on the inside track of a rotating drum. This drum is then spun up to the speed corresponding to a desired framing rate. The image is still relayed to an internal rotating mirror centered at the arc of the drum. The mirror is multi-faceted, typically having six to eight faces. Only one secondary lens is required, as the exposure always occurs at the same point. The series of frames is formed as the film travels across this point. Discrete frames are formed as each successive face of the mirror passes through the optical axis. Rotating drum cameras are capable of speed from the tens of thousands to millions of frames per second, but since the maximum peripheral linear speed of the drum is practically around 500 m/s, increasing the frame rate requires decreasing the frame height and/or increasing the number of frames exposed from the rotating mirror.

In both types of rotating mirror cameras, double exposure can occur if the system is not controlled properly. In a pure rotating mirror camera, this happens if the mirror makes a second pass across the optics while light is still entering the camera. In a rotating drum camera, it happens if the drum makes more than one revolution while light is entering the camera. Many cameras use ultra high speed shutters such as those employing explosives to shatter a block of glass, rendering it opaque. Alternatively, high speed flashes with a controlled duration can be used. In modern ccd imaging systems, the sensors can be shuttered within microseconds, obviating the need for an external shutter.

Rotating mirror camera technology has more recently been applied to electronic imaging, where instead of film, an array of single shot CCD or CMOS cameras is arrayed around the rotating mirror. This adaptation enables all of the advantages of electronic imaging in combination with the speed and resolution of the rotating mirror approach. Speeds up to 25 million frames per second are achievable, with typical speeds in the millions of fps.

Commercial availability of both types of rotating mirror cameras began in the 1950s with Beckman & Whitley, and Cordin Company. Beckman & Whitley sold both rotating mirror and rotating drum cameras, and coined the "Dynafax" term. In the mid-1960s, Cordin Company bought Beckman & Whitley and has been the sole source of rotating mirror cameras since. An offshoot of Cordin Company, Millisecond Cinematography, provided drum camera technology to the commercial cinematography market.

=== Image dissection ===
Most image dissection camera designs involve thousands of fiber optic fibers bundled together that are then separated into a line that is recorded with traditional streak camera means (rotating drum, rotating mirror, etc.). The resolution is limited to the number of fibers, and commonly only a few thousand fibers can be practically used.

=== Raster cameras ===
Raster cameras, which are often referred to as image dissection cameras in literature, involve the principle that only a small fraction of an image needs to be recorded to produce a discernible image. This principle is used most commonly in lenticular printing where many images are placed on the same material and an array of cylindrical lenses (or slits) only allows one part of the image to be viewed at a time.

Most raster cameras operate using a black grid with very thin lines etched into it, with hundreds or thousands of transparent lines in between much thicker opaque areas. If each slit is 1/10 the width as each opaque area, when the raster is moved, 10 images can be recorded in the distance between two slits. This principle allows extremely high time resolution by sacrificing some spatial resolution (most cameras only have around 60,000 pixels, about 250x250 pixel resolution), with recorded rates of up to 1.5 billion frames per second. Raster techniques have been applied to streak cameras made from image converters for much higher speeds. The raster image is often moved through a rotating mirror system, but the raster itself can also be moved across a sheet of film. These cameras can be very difficult to synchronize, as they often have limited recording times (under 200 frames) and frames are easily overwritten.

The raster can be made with lenticular sheets, a grid of opaque slits, arrays of tapered (Selfoc) fiber optics, etc.

=== Streak photography ===
Streak photography (closely related to strip photography) uses a streak camera to combine a series of essentially one-dimensional images into a two-dimensional image. The terms "streak photography" and "strip photography" are often interchanged, though some authors draw a distinction.

By removing the prism from a rotary prism camera and using a very narrow slit in place of the shutter, it is possible to take images whose exposure is essentially one dimension of spatial information recorded continuously over time. Streak records are therefore a space vs. time graphical record. The image that results allows for very precise measurement of velocities. It is also possible to capture streak records using rotating mirror technology at much faster speeds. Digital line sensors can be used for this effect as well, as can some two-dimensional sensors with a slit mask.

For the development of explosives the image of a line of sample was projected onto an arc of film via a rotating mirror. The advance of flame appeared as an oblique image on the film, from which the velocity of detonation was measured.

Motion compensation photography (also known as ballistic synchro photography or smear photography when used to image high-speed projectiles) is a form of streak photography. When the motion of the film is opposite to that of the subject with an inverting (positive) lens, and synchronized appropriately, the images show events as a function of time. Objects remaining motionless show up as streaks. This is the technique used for finish line photographs. At no time is it possible to take a still photograph that duplicates the results of a finish line photograph taken with this method. A still is a photograph in time, a streak/smear photograph is a photograph of time. When used to image high-speed projectiles the use of a slit (as in streak photography) produce very short exposure times ensuring higher image resolution. The use for high-speed projectiles means that one still image is normally produced on one roll of cine film. From this image information such as yaw or pitch can be determined. Because of its measurement of time variations in velocity will also be shown by lateral distortions of the image.

By combining this technique with a diffracted wavefront of light, as by a knife-edge, it is possible to take photographs of phase perturbations within a homogeneous medium. For example, it is possible to capture shockwaves of bullets and other high-speed objects. See, for example, shadowgraph and schlieren photography.

In December 2011, a research group at MIT reported a combined implementation of the laser (stroboscopic) and streak camera applications to capture images of a repetitive event that can be reassembled to create a trillion-frame-per-second video. This rate of image acquisition, which enables the capture of images of moving photons, is possible by the use of the streak camera to collect each field of view rapidly in narrow single streak images. Illuminating a scene with a laser that emits pulses of light every 13 nanoseconds, synchronized to the streak camera with repeated sampling and positioning, researchers have demonstrated collection of one-dimensional data which can be computationally compiled into a two-dimensional video. Although this approach is limited by time resolution to repeatable events, stationary applications such as medical ultrasound or industrial material analysis are possibilities.

== Video ==
Rupture of water filled balloon captured at 480 frame/s

High-speed photographs can be examined individually to follow the progress of an activity, or they can be displayed rapidly in sequence as a moving film with slowed-down motion.

Slow-motion: female leafcutter bee flying to and from a Great Valley gumplant blossom. Notice the bee’s long tongue being withdrawn as it takes flight. 6,000 fps played at 30 fps.

Early video cameras using tubes (such as the Vidicon) suffered from severe "ghosting" due to the fact that the latent image on the target remained even after the subject had moved. Furthermore, as the system scanned the target, the motion of the scanning relative to the subject resulted in artifacts that compromised the image. The target in Vidicon type camera tubes can be made of various photoconductive chemicals such as antimony sulfide (Sb_{2}S_{3}), lead(II) oxide (PbO), and others with various image "stick" properties. The Farnsworth Image Dissector did not suffer from image "stick" of the type Vidicons exhibit, and so related special image converter tubes might be used to capture short frame sequences at very high speed.

The mechanical shutter, invented by Pat Keller and others at China Lake in 1979, helped freeze the action and eliminate ghosting. This was a mechanical shutter similar to the one used in high-speed film cameras—a disk with a wedge removed. The opening was synchronized to the frame rate, and the size of the opening was proportional to the integration or shutter time. By making the opening very small, the motion could be stopped.

Despite the resulting improvements in image quality, these systems were still limited to 60 frame/s.

Other Image Converter tube based systems emerged in the 1950s which incorporated a modified GenI image intensifier with additional deflector plates which allowed a photon image to be converted to a photoelectron beam. The image, while in this photoelectron state, could be shuttered on and off as short as a few nanoseconds, and deflected to different areas of the large 70 and 90 mm diameter phosphor screens to produce sequences of up to 20+ frames. In the early 1970s these camera attained speeds up to 600 million frame/s, with 1 ns exposure times, with more than 20 frames per event. As they were analog devices there were no digital limitations on data rates and pixel transfer rates. However, image resolution was quite limited, due to the inherent repulsion of electrons and the grain of the phosphor screen, as well as the small size of each individual image. Resolutions of 10 lp/mm were typical. Also, the images were inherently monochrome, as wavelength information is lost in the photon-electron-photon conversion process. There was also a fairly steep trade-off between resolution and number of images. All images needed to fall on the output phosphor screen. Therefore, a four image sequence would mean each image occupies one fourth of the screen; a nine image sequence has each image occupying one ninth, etc. Images were projected and held on the tube's phosphor screen for several milliseconds, long enough to be optically, and later fiber optically, coupled to film for image capture. Cameras of this design were made by Hadland Photonics Limited and NAC. It was difficult to change the exposure time without changing the frame rate with earlier designs, but later models added additional "shuttering" plates to allow exposure time and framing rate to be altered independently. The limiting factor of these systems is the time an image can be swept to the next position.

In addition to framing tubes, these tubes could also be configured with one or two sets of deflector plates in one axis. As light was converted to photoelectrons, these photoelectrons could be swept across the phosphor screen at incredible sweep speeds limited only by the sweep electronics, to generate the first electronic streak cameras. With no moving parts, sweep speeds of up to 10 picoseconds per mm could be attained, thus giving technical time resolution of several picoseconds. As early as the 1973–74 there were commercial streak cameras capable of 3 picosecond time resolution derived from the need to evaluate the ultra short laser pulses which were being developed at that time. Electronic streak cameras are still used today with time resolution as short as sub picoseconds, and are the only true way to measure short optical events in the picosecond time scale.

=== CCD ===
The introduction of the CCD revolutionized high-speed photography in the 1980s. The staring array configuration of the sensor eliminated the scanning artifacts. Precise control of the integration time replaced the use of the mechanical shutter. However, the CCD architecture limited the rate at which images could be read off the sensor. Most of these systems still ran at NTSC rates (approximately 60 frame/s), but some, especially those built by the Kodak Spin Physics group, ran faster and recorded onto specially constructed video tape cassettes. The Kodak MASD group developed the first HyG (rugged) high-speed digital color camera called the RO that replaced 16-mm crash sled film cameras. Many new innovations and recording methods were introduced in the RO and further enhancements were introduced in the HG2000, a camera that could run at 1000 frame/s with a 512 x 384 pixel sensor for 2 seconds. Kodak MASD group also introduced an ultra high-speed CCD camera called the HS4540 that was designed and manufactured by Photron in 1991 that recorded 4,500 frame/s at 256 x 256. The HS4540 was used extensively by companies manufacturing automotive air bags to do lot testing which required the fast record speed to image a 30 ms deployment. Roper Industries purchased this division from Kodak in November 1999 and it was merged with Redlake (which was also purchased by Roper Industries). Redlake has since been purchased by IDT, which is today a market leader in the high speed camera market, and continues to serve the automotive crash test market.

=== Gated intensified CCD ===
In the early 1990s very fast cameras based on micro-channel plate (MCP) image intensifiers were developed. The MCP intensifier is similar to technology used for night vision applications. They are based on a similar photon-electron-photon conversion as the above-described image converter tubes, but incorporate a micro-channel plate. This plate is given a high-voltage charge such that electrons coming from the input photocathode to the holes create a cascading effect, thereby amplifying the image signal. These electrons fall on an output phosphor, creating the emission of photons that compose the resulting image. The devices can be switched on and off at the picosecond time scale. The output of the MCP is coupled to a CCD, usually by means of a fused fiber-optic taper, creating an electronic camera with very high sensitivity and capable of very short exposure times, though also one that is inherently monochrome due to wavelength information being lost in the photon-electron-photon conversion. The pioneering work in this area was done by Paul Hoess while at PCO Imaging in Germany.

A sequence of images at these very fast speeds can be obtained by multiplexing MCP-CCD cameras behind an optical beam splitter and switching the MCP devices using an electronic sequencer control. These systems typically use eight to sixteen MCP-CCD imagers, yielding a frame sequence at speeds up to 100 billion fps. Some systems were built with interline CCDs, which enables two images per channel, or a 32 frame sequence, though not at the highest speeds (because of the minimum time of the interline transfer). These types of cameras were built by Hadland Photonics and then DRS Hadland till 2010. Specialised Imaging in the UK also manufactures these cameras, which achieve rates at up to a billion frames per second. However, the minimum exposure time is 3 nanoseconds which limits the effective framing rate to several hundred million frames per second. In 2003, Stanford Computer Optics introduced the multi-framing camera, XXRapidFrame. It allows Image sequences of up to 8 images with a shutter time down to 200 picoseconds at a frame rate of several billion frames per second.

=== IS-CCD ===
Another approach for capturing images at extremely high speeds is with an ISIS (In Situ storage) CCD chip, such as in the Shimadzu HPV-1 and HPV-2 cameras. In a typical interline transfer CCD chip, each pixel has a single register. Charge from an individual pixel can be quickly transferred into its register in the microsecond time scale. These charges are then read out of the chip and stored in a serial "read" process that takes more time than the transfer to the register. The Shimadzu camera is based on a chip where each pixel has 103 registers. Charge from the pixel can then be transferred into these registers such that the image sequence is stored "on chip" and then read out well after the event of interest is over. Frame rates as high as a billion fps are possible, with current cameras (Kirana and HPV) achieving up to 10 million fps. ISIS cameras have the obvious advantage over rotating mirror cameras that only one photodetector is needed and the frame count can be much higher. Complex synchronization circuitry necessary for synchronous rotating mirror cameras are also not necessary with ISIS. A main issue with in situ storage chips is ghosting of frames and low spatial resolution, but modern devices such as the Kirana from Specialized Imaging have partially solved the issue. The main use of this type of imaging system is one where the event takes place between 50 μs and 2 ms, such as applications with Split-Hopkinson pressure bar, stress analysis, light-gas gun, target impact studies and DIC (Digital Image Correlation).

ISIS sensors have achieved rates of more than 3.5 terapixels per second, hundreds of times better than the state of the art high speed readout cameras.

=== Rotating mirror CCD ===
Rotating mirror film camera technology has been adapted to take advantage of CCD imaging by putting an array of CCD cameras around a rotating mirror in place of film. The operating principles are substantially similar to those of rotating mirror film cameras, in that the image is relayed from an objective lens to a rotating mirror, and then back to each CCD camera, which are all essentially operating as single shot cameras. Framing rate is determined by the speed of the mirror, not the read-out rate of the imaging chip, as in single chip CCD and CMOS systems. This means these cameras must necessarily work in a burst mode, as they only can capture as many frames as there are CCD devices (typically 50–100). They are also much more elaborate (and therefore costly) systems than single chip high-speed cameras. These systems do, however, achieve the maximum combination of speed and resolution, as they have no trade-off between speed and resolution. Typical speeds are in the millions of frames per second, and typical resolutions are 2 to 8 megapixels per image. These types of cameras were introduced by the Beckman Whitley company and later purchased and made by Cordin Company.

=== CMOS ===
Exploding cantaloupe recorded at 600 frames per second with a Casio EX-F1 camera.

The introduction of CMOS sensor technology again revolutionized high-speed photography in the 1990s and serves as a classic example of a disruptive technology. Based on the same materials as computer memory, the CMOS process was cheaper to build than CCD and easier to integrate with on-chip memory and processing functions. They also offer much greater flexibility in defining sub-arrays as active. This enables high-speed CMOS cameras to have broad flexibility in trading off speed and resolution. Current high-speed CMOS cameras offer full resolution framing rates in the thousands of fps with resolutions in the low megapixels. But these same cameras can be easily configured to capture images in the millions of fps, though with significantly reduced resolution. The image quality and quantum efficiency of CCD devices is still marginally superior to CMOS.

The first patent of an Active Pixel Sensor (APS), submitted by JPL's Eric Fossum, led to the spin-off of Photobit, which was eventually bought by Micron Technology. However, Photobit's first interest was in the standard video market; the first high-speed CMOS system was NAC Image Technology's HSV 1000, first produced in 1990. Vision Research Phantom, Photron, NAC, Mikrotron, IDT, and other High-speed camera uses CMOS imaging sensors (CIS) in their cameras. Vision Research Phantom's first CMOS sensor, used in the Phantom 4, was designed at the Belgian Interuniversity Microelectronics Center (IMEC). These systems quickly made inroads into the 16 mm high-speed film camera market despite resolution and record times (the Phantom 4 was a 1024 x 1024 pixel, or 1 megapixel, with a run capacity of 4 s at full frame and 1000 frame/s). IMEC in 2000 spun the research group off as FillFactory which became the dominant player in the design of streaming high speed image sensors. FillFactory was in 2004 purchased by Cypress Semiconductor and in sold again to ON Semiconductor, while key staff went on to create CMOSIS in 2007 and Caeleste in 2006. Photobit eventually introduced a 500 frame/s 1.3 megapixel sensor, a true camera-on-chip device found in many low-end high-speed systems.

Subsequently, several camera manufacturers compete in the high-speed digital video market, including iX-Cameras, AOS Technologies, Fastec Imaging, Mega Speed Corp, NAC, Olympus, Photron, Mikrotron, Redlake, Vision Research, Slow Motion Camera Company and IDT, with sensors developed by Photobit, Cypress, CMOSIS, and in-house designers. In addition to those science and engineering types of cameras, an entire industry has been built up around industrial machine vision systems and requirements. The major application has been for high-speed manufacturing. A system typically consists of a camera, a frame grabber, a processor, and communications and recording systems to document or control the manufacturing process.

=== Infrared ===
High-speed infrared photography has become possible with the introduction of the Amber Radiance, and later the Indigo Phoenix. Amber was purchased by Raytheon, the Amber design team left and formed Indigo, and Indigo is now owned by FLIR Systems. Telops, Xenics, Santa Barbara Focal Plane, CEDIP, and Electrophysics have also introduced high-speed infrared systems.

== See also ==
- 16 mm film
- 35 mm film
- 70 mm film
- Air-gap flash
- Fastax (High-speed camera)
- Femto-photography
- Harold Eugene Edgerton
- High-speed camera
- Nature photography
- Photron (Photron FASTCAM high-speed cameras)
- slow motion (less advanced than high-speed photography)
- Vision Research Phantom (Vision Research Phantom high-speed cameras)
- Wildlife photography

== Notes ==
- Documentary "Moving Still" (1980 broadcast on PBS Nova and BBS Horizon) has footage of these processes up to the modern solid state era.
