= High-speed camera =

Device capable of capturing images at 250 or more frames per second

A high-speed camera is a device capable of capturing moving images with exposures of less than 1/1000 second, or frame rates in excess of 250 frames per second. It is used for recording fast-moving objects as photographic images onto a storage medium. After recording, the images stored on the medium can be played back in slow motion. Early high-speed cameras used photographic film to record the high-speed events, but have been superseded by entirely electronic devices using an image sensor (e.g. a charge-coupled device (CCD) or a MOS active pixel sensor (APS)), typically recording over 1000 frames per second onto DRAM, to be played back slowly to study the motion for scientific study of transient phenomena.

== Overview ==
A high-speed camera can be classified as:

1. A high-speed film camera which records to film,
2. A high-speed video camera which records to electronic memory,
3. A high-speed framing camera which records images on multiple image planes or multiple locations on the same image plane (generally film or a network of CCD cameras),
4. A high-speed streak camera which records a series of line-sized images to film or electronic memory.

A normal motion-picture film is played back at 24 frames per second, while television uses 25 frames/s (PAL) or 29.97 frames/s (NTSC). High-speed film cameras can film up to a quarter of a million fps by running the film over a rotating prism or mirror instead of using a shutter, thus reducing the need for stopping and starting the film behind a shutter, which would tear the film stock at such speeds. Using this technique, one second of action can be stretched to more than ten minutes of playback time (super slow motion). High-speed video cameras are widely used for scientific research, military testing and evaluation, and industrial purposes. Examples of industrial applications are filming a manufacturing line to better tune the machine, or in the filming a crash test to investigate its effects on the crash dummy passengers and the automobile. Today, the digital high-speed camera has replaced the film camera used for vehicle impact testing.

Schlieren video of an intermediate ballistic event of a shotshell cartridge. Nathan Boor, Aimed Research.

Television series such as MythBusters and Time Warp often use high-speed cameras to show their tests in slow motion. Saving the recorded high-speed images can be time-consuming because, as of 2017, consumer cameras have resolutions up to four megapixels with frame rates of over 1,000 per second, which will record at a rate of 11 gigabytes per second. Technologically, these cameras are very advanced, yet saving images requires use of slower, standard video-computer interfaces. To reduce the storage space required and the time required for people to examine a recording, only the parts of an action which are of interest can be selected to film. When recording a cyclical process for industrial breakdown analysis, only the relevant parts of each cycle are filmed.

A problem for high-speed cameras is the needed exposure for the film; very bright light is needed to be able to film at 40,000 fps, sometimes leading to the subject of examination being destroyed because of the heat of the lighting. Monochromatic (black-and-white) filming is sometimes used to reduce the light intensity required. Even-higher-speed imaging is possible using specialized electronic charge-coupled device (CCD) imaging systems, which can achieve speeds of over 25 million fps. These cameras, however, still use rotating mirrors, like their older film counterparts. Solid-state cameras can achieve speeds of up to 10 million fps. All development in high-speed cameras is now focused on digital video cameras, which have many operational and cost benefits over film cameras.

In 2010, researchers built a camera that exposed each frame for two trillionths of a second (picoseconds), for an effective frame rate of half a trillion fps (femto-photography). Modern high-speed cameras operate by converting the incident light (photons) into a stream of electrons, which are then deflected onto a photoanode, back into photons, which can then be recorded onto either film or CCD.

== Uses in television ==
- The show MythBusters prominently uses high-speed cameras for measuring speed or height.
- Time Warp was centered around the use of high-speed cameras to slow things down that are usually too fast to see with the naked eye.
- High-speed cameras are frequently used in television productions of many major sporting events for slow motion instant replays when normal slow motion is not slow enough, such as international Cricket matches.

== Uses in science ==
Slow-motion: female leafcutter bee flying to and from a Great Valley gumplant blossom. Recorded full frame (1920×1080) with the Mega Speed Max-V3 at 3,000 fps and 75 microsecond shutter speed. Final Cut Pro and Topaz Video AI used to present it at 6,000 fps and played at 30 fps.

High-speed cameras are frequently used in science to characterize events that happen too fast for traditional film speeds. Biomechanics employs such cameras to capture high-speed animal movements, such as jumping by frogs and insects, suction feeding in fish, the strikes of mantis shrimp, and the aerodynamic study of pigeons' helicopter-like movements using motion analysis of the resulting sequences from one or more cameras to characterize the motion in either 2D or 3D.

The move from film to digital technology has greatly reduced the difficulty using these technologies to record unpredictable behaviors, specifically via the use of continuous recording and post-triggering. With high-speed film cameras, an investigator must start the film and then entice the animal to perform the behavior in the short time before the film runs out, resulting in many useless sequences where the animal behaves too late or not at all. In modern high-speed digital cameras, the camera can simply record continuously as the investigator attempts to elicit the behavior, after which a trigger button will stop the recording and allow the investigator to save a given time interval before and after the trigger (determined by frame rate, image size, and memory capacity during continuous recording). Most software allows saving a subset of recorded frames, minimizing file-size issues by eliminating useless frames before or after the sequence of interest. Such triggering can also be used to synchronize recording across multiple cameras.

The explosion of alkali metals on contact with water has been studied using a high-speed camera. Frame-by-frame analysis of a sodium-potassium alloy exploding in water, combined with molecular-dynamic simulations, suggested that the initial expansion may be the result of a Coulomb explosion and not combustion of hydrogen gas as previously thought.

Digital high-speed camera footage has strongly contributed to the understanding of lightning when combined with electric-field-measuring instrumentation and sensors which can map the propagation of lightning leaders through the detection of radio waves generated by this process.

== Uses in industry ==
When moving from reactive maintenance to predictive maintenance, it is crucial that breakdowns are well-understood. One of the basic analysis techniques is to use high-speed cameras to characterize events which happen too fast to see. Similar to use in science, with a pre- or post-triggering capability, the camera can simply record continuously as the mechanic waits for the breakdown to happen, following which a trigger signal (internal or external) will stop the recording and allow the investigator to save a given time interval prior to the trigger. Some software allows viewing the issues in real time, by displaying only a subset of recorded frames, minimizing file-size and watch-time issues by eliminating useless frames before or after the sequence of interest.

High-speed video cameras are used to augment other industrial technologies such as x-ray radiography. When used with the proper phosphor screen which converts x-rays into visible light, high-speed cameras can be used to capture high-speed x-ray videos of events inside mechanical devices and biological specimens. The imaging speed is mainly limited by the phosphor screen's decay rate and intensity gain, which has a direct relationship on the camera's exposure. Pulsed x-ray sources limit frame rate and should be properly synchronized with camera frame captures.

== Uses in warfare ==
In 1950 Morton Sultanoff a physicist for the U.S. Army at Aberdeen Proving ground, invented a super-high-speed camera that took frames at one-millionth of a second, and was fast enough to record the shockwave of a small explosion. High-speed digital cameras have been used to study how mines dropped from the air will deploy in near-shore regions, including development of various weapon systems. In 2005, high-speed digital cameras with 4-megapixel resolution, recording at 1500 fps, were replacing the 35mm and 70mm high-speed film cameras used on tracking mounts on test ranges that capture ballistic intercepts.

== See also ==
- High frame rate
- Slow motion
- Photron (Photron's FASTCAM High-speed Cameras)
- Vision Research Phantom (Vision Research's Phantom High-Speed Cameras)
- Mikrotron (high-speed cameras)
- High-speed photography
- Rapatronic camera
- Burst mode (photography)
- Hubert Schardin
