= Implosion (mechanical process) =

Destruction of objects by self-collapsing

In an explosion (top), force radiates away from a source. With implosion (bottom), the object collapses upon itself (generally being crushed by an outside force).

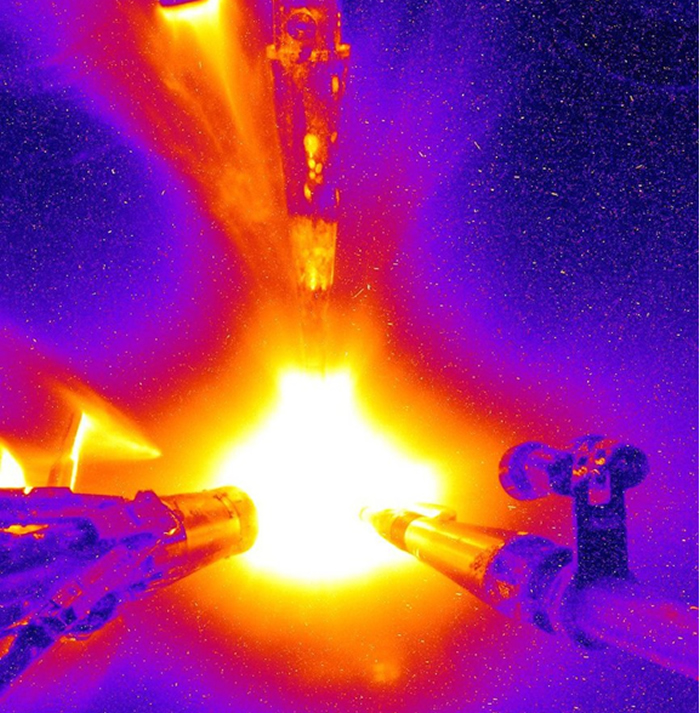
Colorized image of NIF “Bigfoot” deuterium-tritium implosion, February 7, 2016. National Ignition Facility

Implosion is the collapse of an object into itself from a pressure differential or gravitational force. The opposite of explosion (which expands the volume), implosion reduces the volume occupied and concentrates matter and energy. Implosion involves a difference between internal (lower) and external (higher) pressure, or inward and outward forces, that is so large that the structure collapses inward into itself, or into the space it occupied if it is not a completely solid object. Examples of implosion include a submarine being crushed by hydrostatic pressure and the collapse of a star under its own gravitational pressure.

In some but not all cases, an implosion propels material outward, for example due to the force of inward falling material rebounding, or peripheral material being ejected as the inner parts collapse. If the object was previously solid, then implosion usually requires it to take on a more dense form—in effect to be more concentrated, compressed, or converted into a denser material.

== Examples ==
=== Nuclear weapons ===
In an implosion-type nuclear weapon design, a sphere of plutonium, uranium, or other fissile material is imploded by a spherical arrangement of explosive charges. This decreases the material's volume and thus increases its density by a factor of two to three, causing it to reach critical mass and create a nuclear explosion.

In some forms of thermonuclear weapons, the energy from this explosion is then used to implode a capsule of fusion fuel before igniting it, causing a fusion reaction (see Teller–Ulam design). In general, the use of radiation to implode something, as in a hydrogen bomb or in laser driven inertial confinement fusion, is known as radiation implosion.

=== Fluid dynamics ===
Cavitation (bubble formation/collapse in a fluid) involves an implosion process. When a cavitation bubble forms in a liquid (for example, by a high-speed water propeller), this bubble is typically rapidly collapsed—imploded—by the surrounding liquid.

=== Astrophysics ===
Implosion is a key part of the gravitational collapse of large stars, which can lead to the creation of supernovas, neutron stars and black holes.

In the most common case, the innermost part of a large star (called the core) stops burning and without this source of heat, the forces holding electrons and protons apart are no longer strong enough to do so. The core collapses in on itself exceedingly quickly, and becomes a neutron star or black hole; the outer layers of the original star fall inwards and may rebound off the newly created neutron star (if one was created), creating a supernova.

=== Cathode-ray tube and fluorescent lighting implosion ===
A high vacuum exists within all cathode-ray tubes. If the outer glass envelope is damaged, a dangerous implosion may occur. The implosion may scatter glass pieces at dangerous speeds. While the last generations of CRTs used in televisions and computer displays had epoxy-bonded face-plates or other measures to prevent shattering of the envelope, CRTs removed from equipment must be handled carefully to avoid injury.

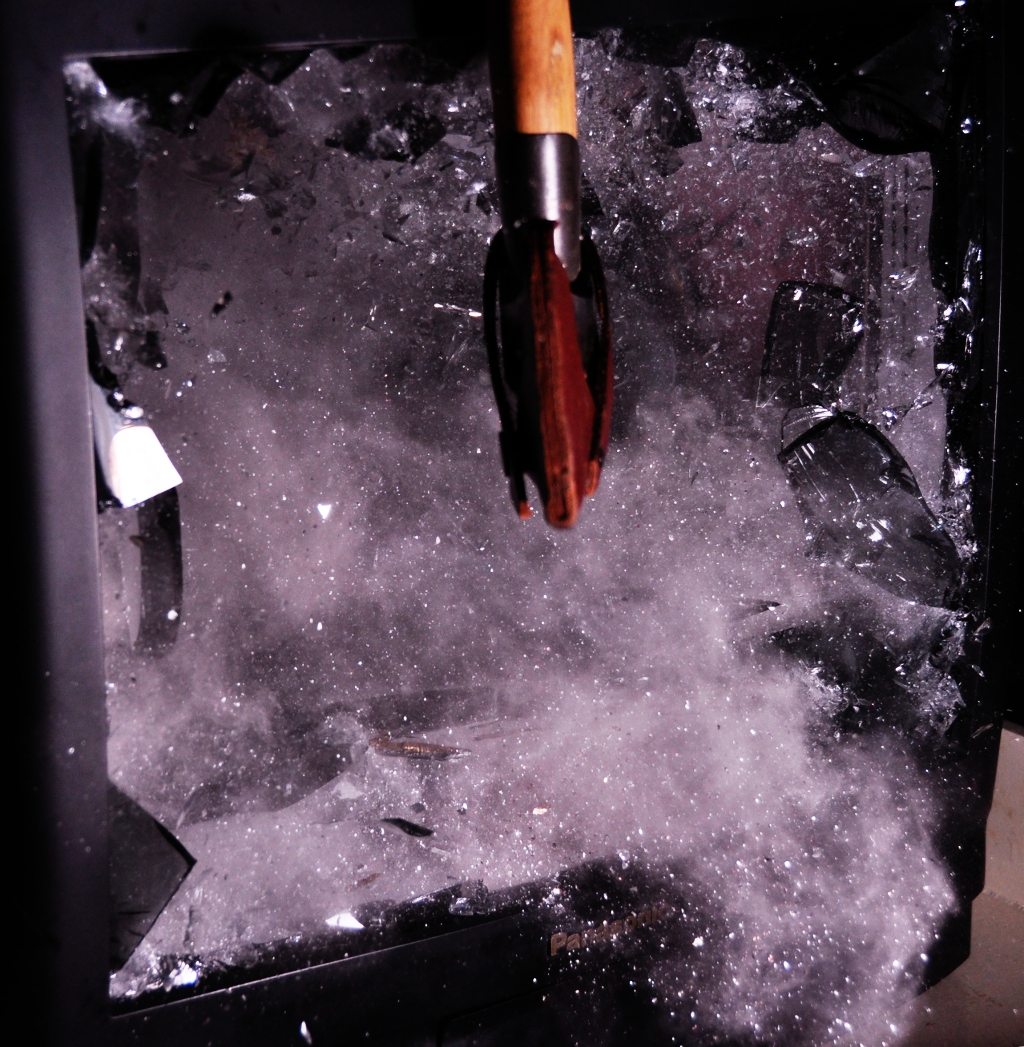
Implosion of a CRT, photographed with a high speed air-gap flash

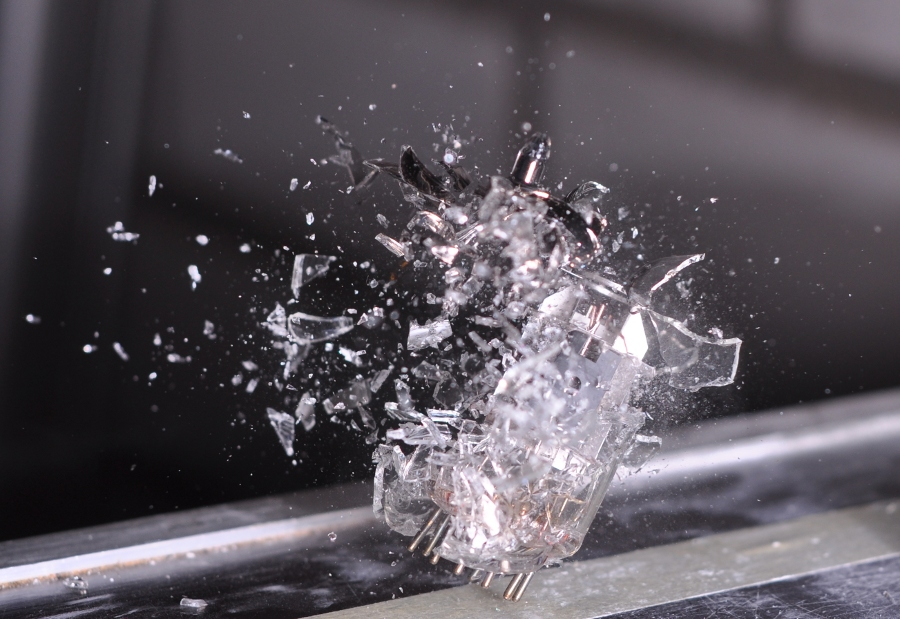
Imploding vacuum tube, photographed with high speed air-gap flash

=== Controlled structure demolition ===
The demolition of large buildings using precisely placed and timed explosions so that the structure collapses on itself is often erroneously described as implosion.

== See also ==
- Titan submersible implosion
- Type II supernova
