= Rope trick effect =

"Spikes" emanating from suspended nuclear explosions

Nuclear explosion milliseconds after detonation. From the Operation Teapot test series in Nevada, 1955, showing fireball and rope trick effects.

Rope trick is the term given by American nuclear physicist John Malik to the curious lines and spikes which emanate from the fireball of nuclear explosions under certain conditions, just after detonation.

== Description ==
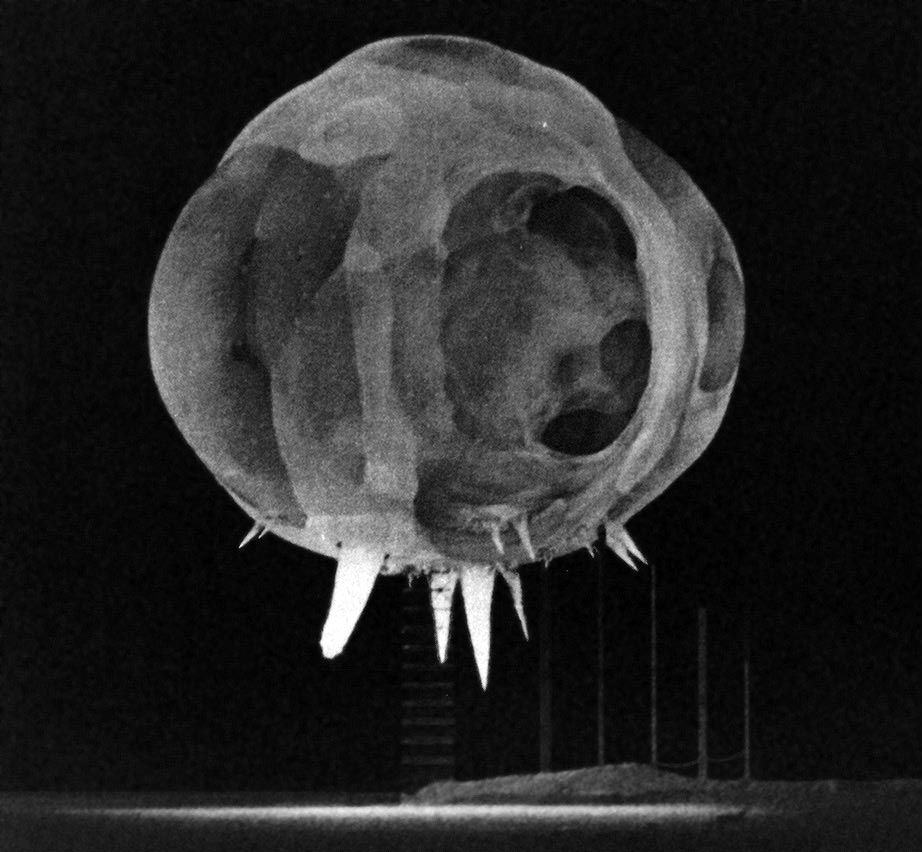
Rope trick effects visible from one of Operation Tumbler–Snapper's tower-mounted test shots in 1952, taken with a rapatronic camera

The adjacent photograph shows two unusual phenomena: bright spikes projecting from the bottom of the fireball, and the peculiar mottling of the expanding fireball surface.

The surface of the fireball, with a temperature over 20,000 kelvin, emits huge amounts of visible light radiation, more than 100 times the intensity at the Sun's surface. Anything solid in the area absorbs the light and rapidly heats. The "rope tricks" that protrude from the bottom of the fireball are caused by the heating, rapid vaporization and then expansion of guy wires that extend from the shot cab—the housing at the top of the bomb tower that contains the explosive device—to the ground. Malik observed that when the guy wires were painted black, spike formation was enhanced, and if it were painted with reflective paint or wrapped in aluminium foil, no spikes were observed – thus confirming the hypothesis that it is heating and vaporization of the rope, induced by exposure to high-intensity visible light radiation, which causes the effect. Because of the lack of guy wires, no "rope trick" effects were observed in surface-detonation tests, free-flying weapons tests, or underground tests.

The cause of a surface mottling is more complex. In the initial microseconds after the explosion, a fireball is formed around the bomb by the massive numbers of thermal x-rays released by the explosion process. These x-rays cannot travel very far in standard atmosphere before reacting with molecules in the air, so the result is a fireball that rapidly forms within about 10 metres (33 ft) in diameter and does not expand. This is known as a "radiatively driven" fireball.

Inside the radiative fireball, the bomb itself is rapidly expanding due to the heat generated by the nuclear reactions. This moves outward at supersonic speeds, creating a hydrodynamic shock wave at its outer edge. After a brief period, this shock front reaches and then passes the initial radiative fireball. The shock wave contains so much energy that the compression heating created in the air causes it to glow. At the point in the explosion captured in the adjacent photo, the shock front has passed the original radiative fireball and has about twice its size.

In the first few microseconds after detonation, the bomb casing and shot cab are destroyed and vaporized. These vapors are accelerated to very high velocities, several tens of kilometers per second, faster than the shock front. However, this acceleration happens in a short period, so the material is trapped behind the shock front, even though it eventually travels faster than the shock front. The various light and dark patches are caused by the varying vapor density of the material splashing against the back of the shock front. The irregular variations in mass distribution around the bomb core create the mottled blob-like appearance.

== Sounding rockets ==
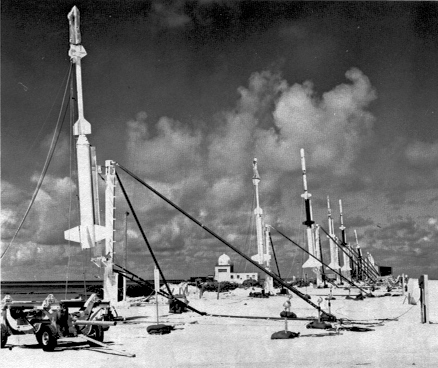
Array of sounding rockets with instruments for making scientific measurements of high-altitude nuclear tests during liftoff preparations on Johnston Island

After a few milliseconds, the energy of the shock front will no longer be great enough to heat the air into incandescence. At that point, the shock front becomes invisible, a process known as "breakaway". This makes the shock wave difficult to diagnose beyond this boundary.

Photographs of nuclear tests often show numerous vertical rope-like lines to one side. These are typically created by small sounding rockets launched a few seconds before the firing, leaving smoke trails. The purpose of these trails is to record the passing of the now invisible shock wave, which causes an obvious visual effect on the smoke by compressing the air into a lens. This is not necessarily related to the rope trick effect in any physical way, but it is possible to confuse the two in some photographs. In the photograph of the Tumbler-Snapper test, the vertical lines in the lower-right corner are blast line poles, not smoke trails.

== Camera recording ==
The photo was shot by a rapatronic camera (a high-speed camera invented by Harold Edgerton and colleagues) built by EG&G. Each camera was capable of recording only one exposure on a single sheet of film. To create time-lapse sequences, banks of four to ten cameras were set up to take photos in rapid succession. The average exposure time was three microseconds.

== Image gallery ==

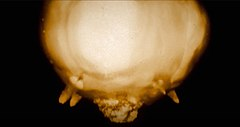

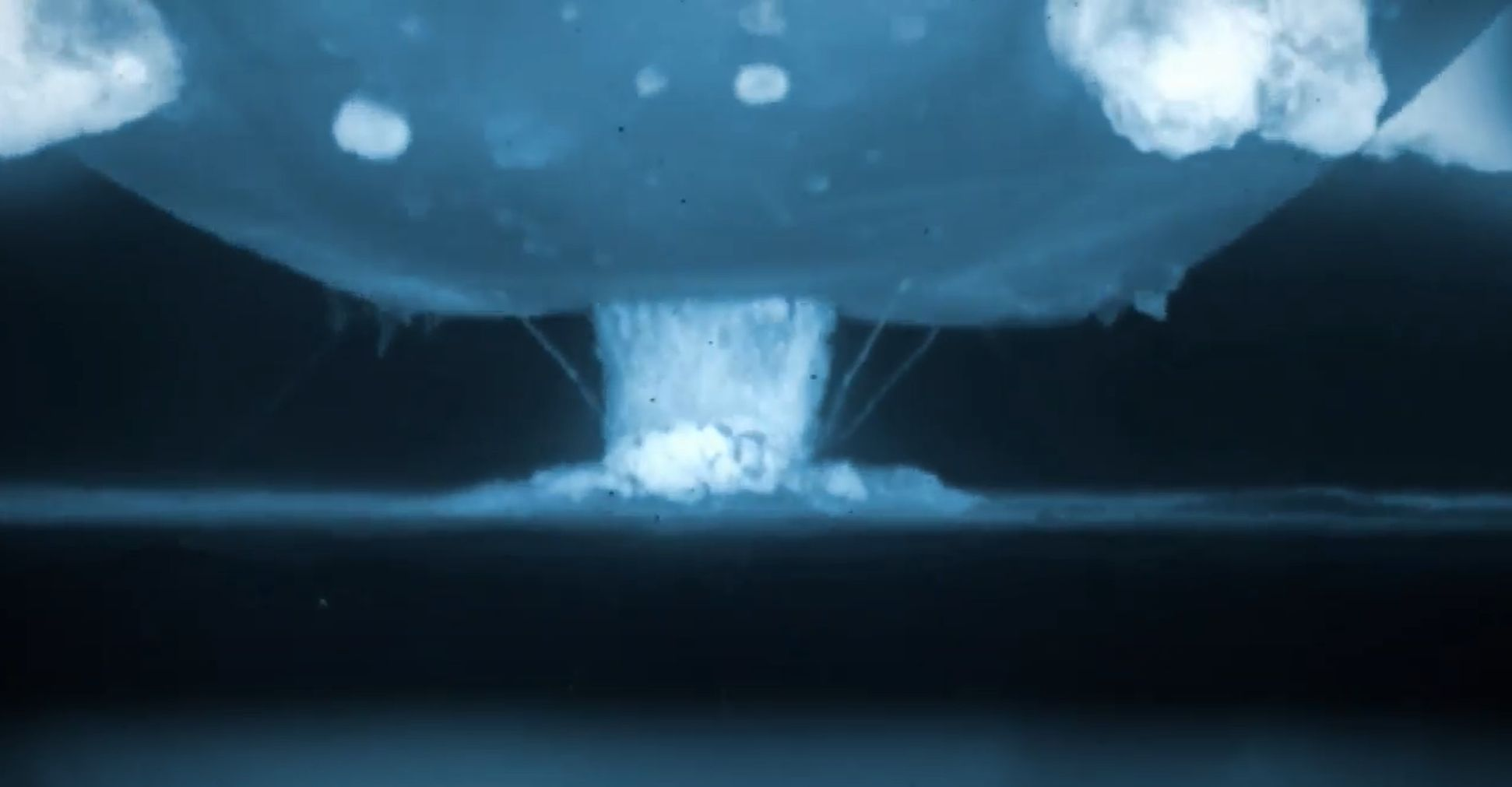

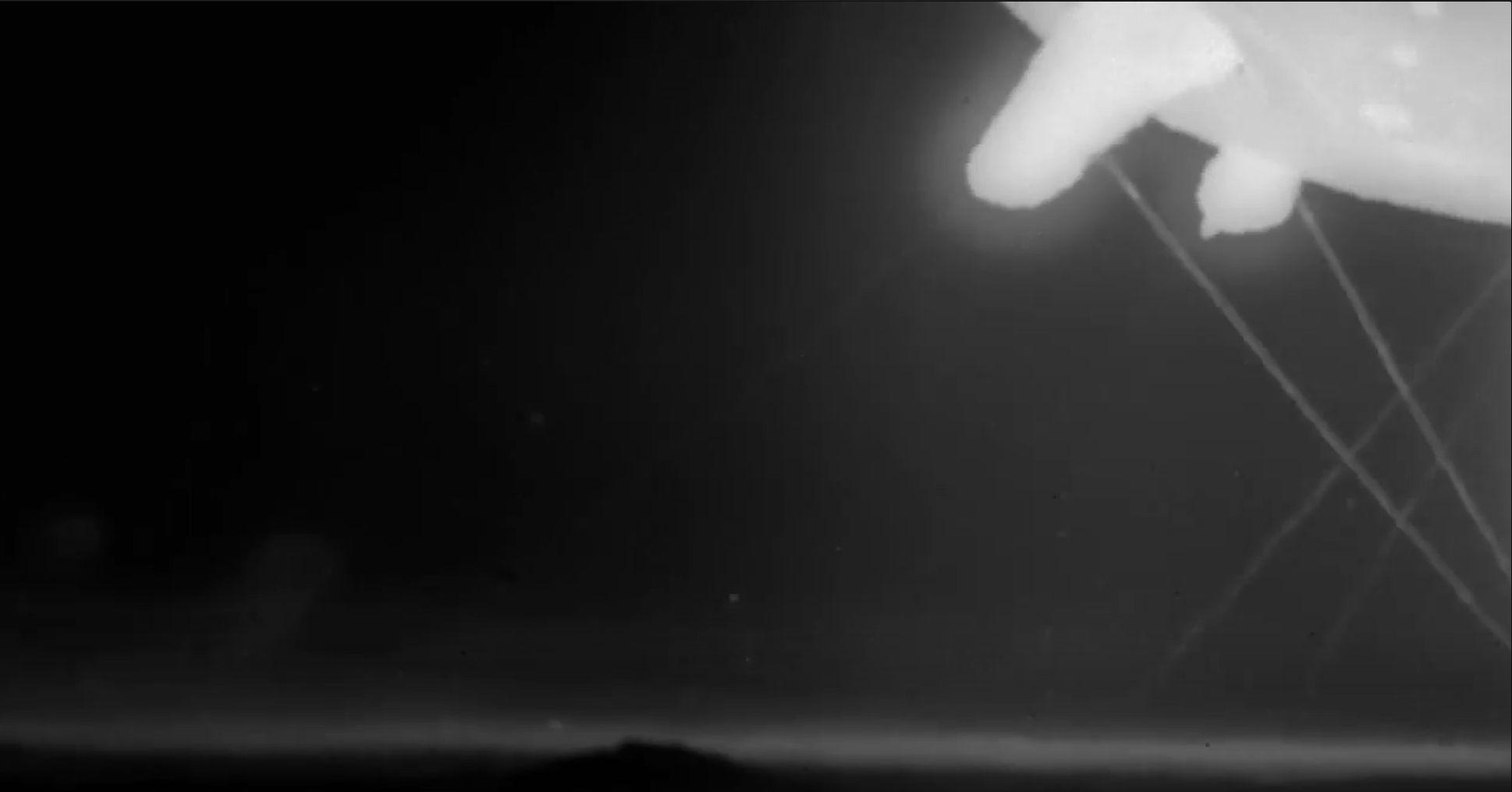

== Sources ==
- This article incorporates text from the National Nuclear Security Administration's "Rapatronic Photography" factsheet (August 2013).
