= Transcontinental Traverse =

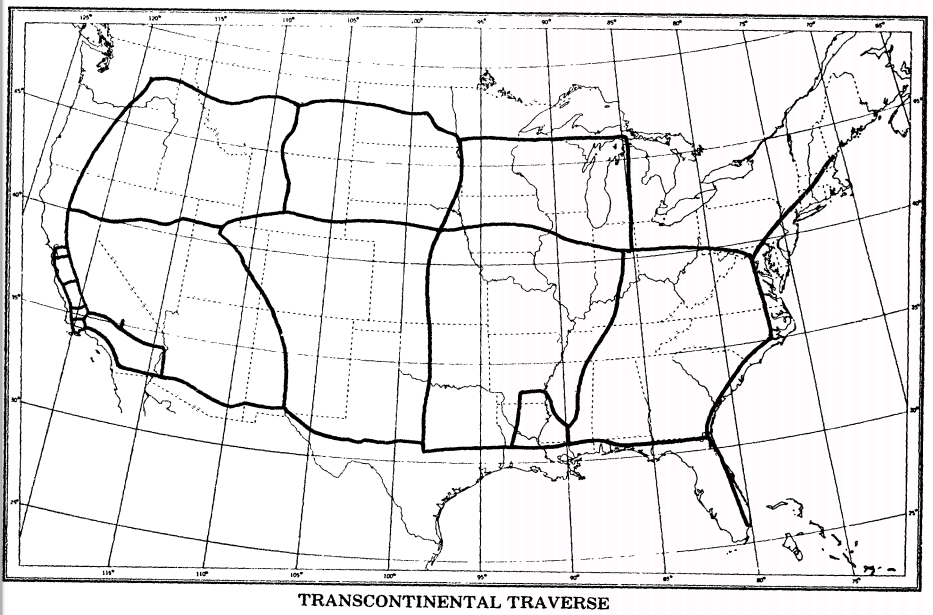
Map of the Transcontinental Traverse

The Transcontinental Traverse (TCT) was a geodetic survey traverse conducted in the continental United States by the United States Coast and Geodetic Survey between 1961 and 1970 and the U.S. National Geodetic Survey between 1970 and 1976. It was the most accurate large-area survey ever done prior to Global Positioning System surveys. TCT included over 2,700 survey stations, covered over 13,600 miles (21,900 km), and passed through 44 U.S. states.

This nationwide survey increased the accuracy of the existing U.S. survey network. It was also fundamental to the sophisticated mathematical readjustment of the nation's survey network known as the North American Datum of 1983. It was the "end of an era" as the last conventional, purely terrestrial large scale survey.

== Forerunner surveys ==
The first major transcontinental survey was the Transcontinental Arc of Triangulation, completed in 1896 along the 39th parallel north with coastal endpoints at Cape May Lighthouse at Cape May, New Jersey, and Point Arena Light near Point Arena, California. It established the Meades Ranch survey marker, also called the Geodetic Center of the United States.

The Transcontinental Traverse, commonly known as the "TCT", grew out of smaller surveying projects that the U.S. Coast and Geodetic Survey (USC&GS) conducted for the United States Air Force missile-tracking program in an area near Cape Canaveral, Florida, during the 1960s. The USC&GS developed unique specifications for this work that resulted in one part in 1,000,000, exceeding Air Force requirements. This led USC&GS officials to conclude that applying the same specifications to a nationwide traverse, a surveying method, would dramatically improve the scale of the entire U.S. survey network. Soon after completing its work for the Air Force in Florida in 1961, the USC&GS embarked on the TCT.

== Route and history ==
The Geodimeter electronic distance measurement device was rapidly tested and adopted by U.S. national agencies for long-distance mapping. The last base line to be measured with tape happened near Salmon, Idaho, in 1958.

The survey began in 1961 in Florida and ended in 1976 in Michigan. It crisscrossed North America along three east–west and five north–south corridors. A portion that had been planned to traverse the U.S.-Canada border to Maine was canceled due to advances in satellite geodesy.

== Equipment and methods ==
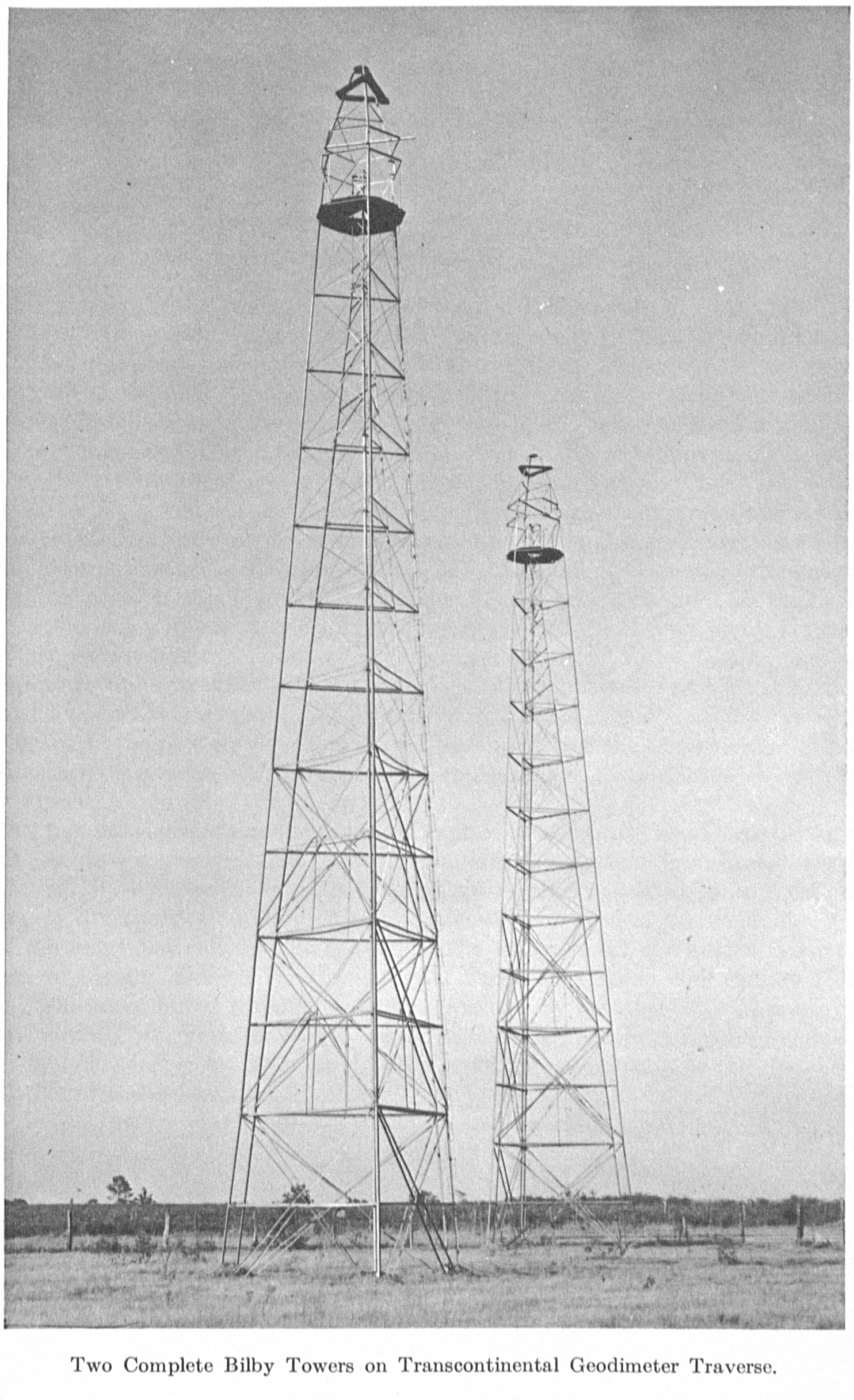
Two complete Bilby towers on Transcontinental Traverse

The traverse made use of the Geodimeter, a lightwave phase electronic distance measurement instrument that had just been invented when the traverse began. The instruments were located atop Bilby towers many meters above ground level to avoid obscuring objects and to get a smoother air temperature profile for accuracy. Due to the light source then in use, the Geodimeter could only be operated at night.

=== Satellite triangulation ===
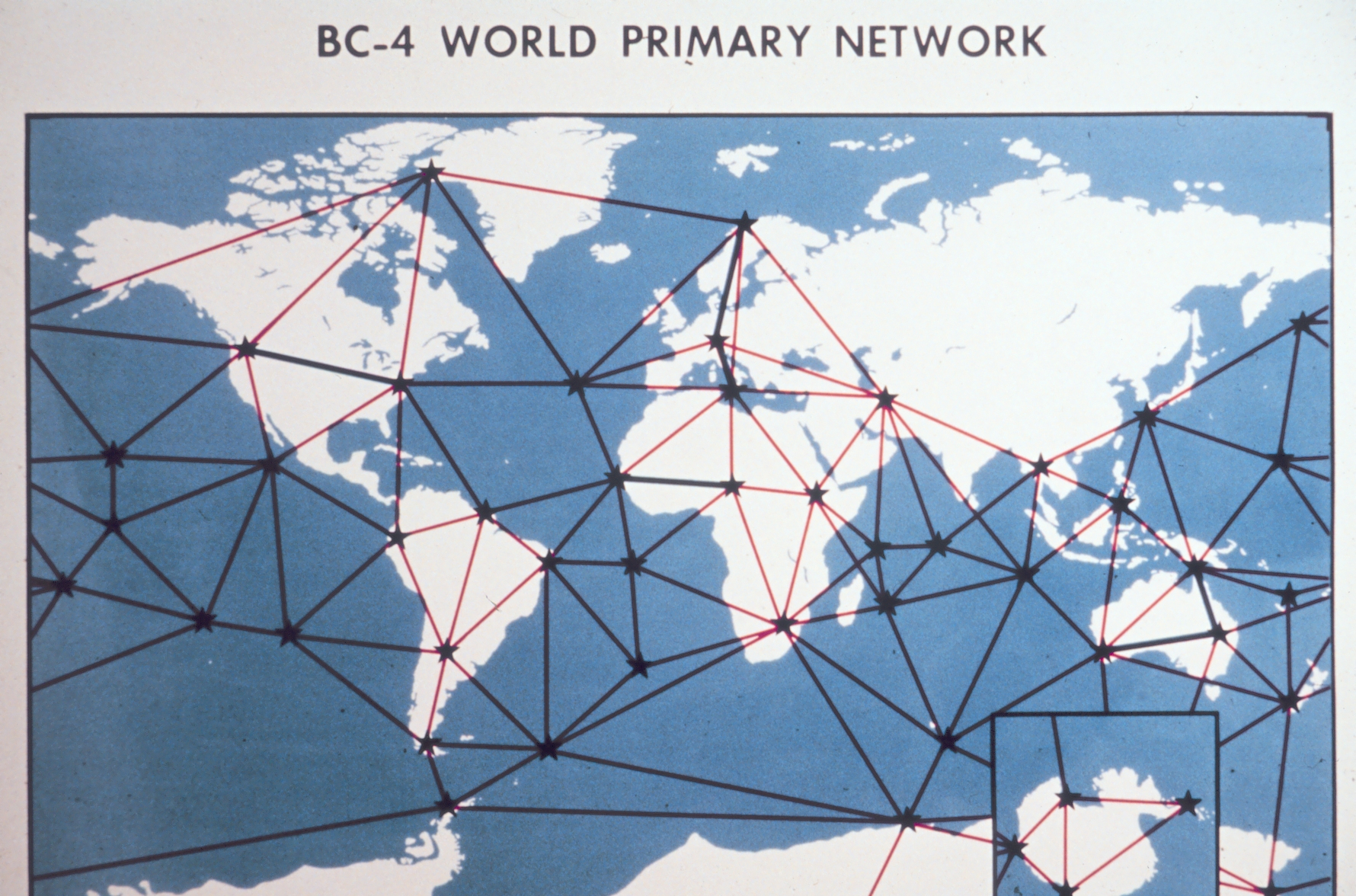
NOAA map of the world showing satellite triangulation stations in Maryland and Washington State

Photographic satellite triangulation stations were tied in to the traverse at Moses Lake, Washington; Chandler, Minnesota; Beltsville, Maryland; and four other locations. The Moses Lake and Beltsville sites became part of a worldwide satellite geodesy network.

== See also ==
- Geodetic control network
- Great Trigonometrical Survey of India
