= Traverse (surveying) =

Surveying method

Traverse is a method in the field of surveying to establish control networks. It is also used in geodesy. Traverse networks involve placing survey stations along a line or path of travel, and then using the previously surveyed points as a base for observing the next point. Connected survey lines form the framework and the directions and lengths of the survey lines are measured with an angle measuring instrument and tape or chain. Traverse networks have many advantages, including:

- Less reconnaissance and organization needed;
- While in other systems, which may require the survey to be performed along a rigid polygon shape, the traverse can change to any shape and thus can accommodate a great deal of different terrains;
- Only a few observations need to be taken at each station, whereas in other survey networks a great deal of angular and linear observations need to be made and considered;
- Traverse networks are free of the strength of figure considerations that happen in triangular systems;
- Scale error does not add up as the traverse is performed. Azimuth swing errors can also be reduced by increasing the distance between stations.

The traverse is more accurate than triangulateration (a combined function of the triangulation and trilateration practice).

== Types ==
Frequently in surveying engineering and geodetic science, control points (CP) are setting/observing distance and direction (bearings, angles, azimuths, and elevation). The CP throughout the control network may consist of monuments, benchmarks, vertical control, etc. There are mainly two types of traverse:

- Closed traverse: either originates from a station and returns to the same station completing a circuit, or runs between two known stations

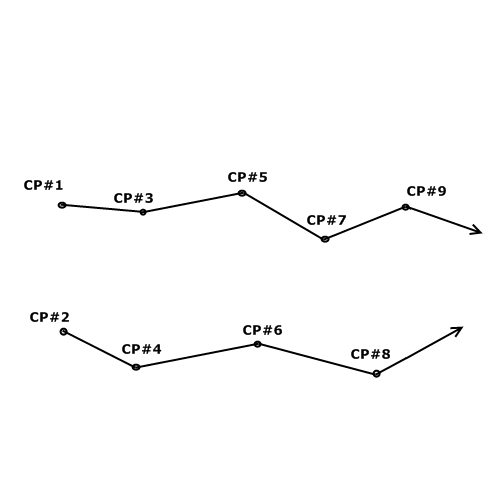
Diagram of an open traverse

- Open traverse: neither returns to its starting station, nor closes on any other known station.
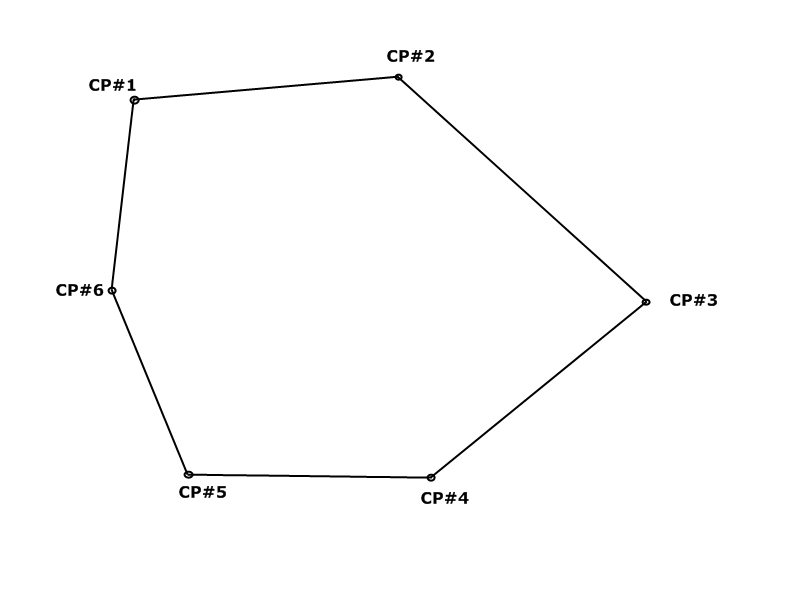
  Diagram of a closed traverse
- Compound traverse: it is where an open traverse is linked at its ends to an existing traverse to form a closed traverse. The closing line may be defined by coordinates at the end points which have been determined by previous survey. The difficulty is, where there is linear misclosure, it is not known whether the error is in the new survey or the previous survey.

== Components ==
- Control point — The primary/base control used for preliminary measurements; it may consist of any known point capable of establishing accurate control of distance and direction (i.e. coordinates, elevation, bearings, etc.).
1. Starting – The initial starting control point of the traverse.
2. Observation – All known control points that are set or observed within the traverse.
3. Terminal – The initial ending control point of the traverse; its coordinates are unknown.tr

== See also ==
- Great Trigonometrical Survey
- Polygonal chain
- Side shot
- Transcontinental Traverse
