= Photron =

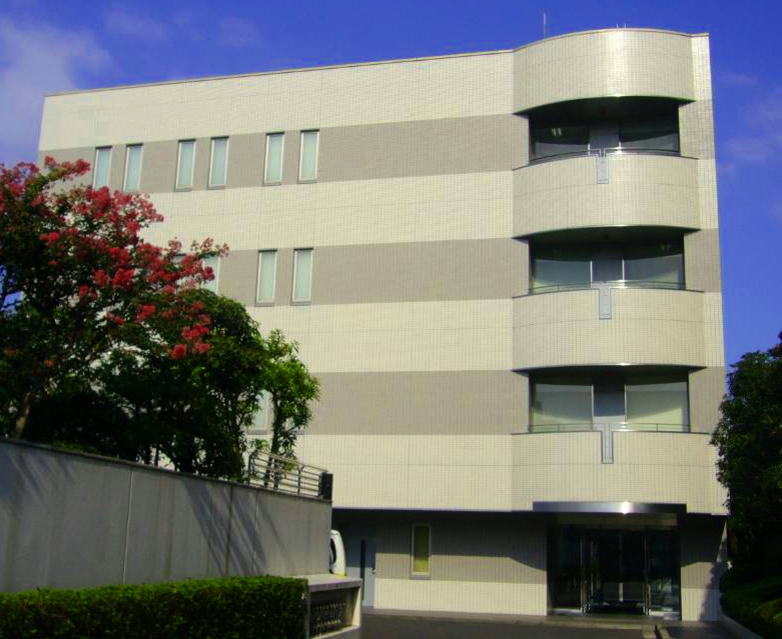
- Industry: high-speed digital cameras
- Founded: 1974
- Headquarters: Tokyo, Japan
- Products: Photron Cameras: FASTCAM, SA Series
- Website: www.photron.com

Photron is a Japanese company that manufactures high-speed digital cameras. It is headquartered in Tokyo, Japan, with offices in San Diego, California, and the United Kingdom. The company's FASTCAM series is used to capture high-speed images for slow-motion playback in scientific and industrial applications.

Photron's cameras are employed in a wide range of fields. In scientific research, they are used for flow visualization, flame propagation, ballistics, firearm studies, and material science. They are also applied in weapon development, biological science, biophysics, and vehicle impact studies related to crash safety. Beyond these uses, Photron technology is employed in manufacturing, mining, automotive research, and other industrial and scientific applications.

== History ==
=== 1968–1991 ===
In July 1968, Osawa Laboratories, the predecessor of Photron, was established by J. Osawa & Co. as a subsidiary. The founding date is recorded as July 10, 1968. Photron Limited, another subsidiary of J. Osawa & Co., was created in June 1974. The name "Photron" combines photon and electron, reflecting the process of creating electronic digital images from light. The company initially produced high-speed cameras that were available only in Japan, along with professional film, video, and photo-instrumentation equipment. It later expanded into photo-optics and electronic technologies, including the manufacture of high-speed digital cameras.

In September 1983, Osawa Laboratories and Photron Limited merged to form a single entity under the name Photron Limited, which remained a subsidiary of J. Osawa & Co. In May 1984, J. Osawa & Co. sold all shares of Photron Limited to the Japanese firm Chisan Limited.

The Komae Plant was closed in June 1985, and new facilities were opened in Ebina City, Kanagawa Prefecture, along with a branch office in Nagoya. In 1987, Photron signed a distributorship agreement to sell Cintel telecine equipment in Japan. The company opened a U.S. office in San Jose, California in 1988.

In 1990, Photron collaborated with Kinki University to develop a new block-readout multichannel NMOS architecture sensor. The resulting design produced a 256 × 256 pixel sensor capable of 4,500 fps, which surpassed the then-leading Eastman Kodak SP2000 Motion Analyzer (240 × 192 pixels at 2,000 fps). In March 1991, Photron opened the Yonezawa Plant in Yamagata Prefecture.

=== 1992–2011 ===
In July 1992, IMAGICA Corp. acquired all shares of Photron Limited from Chisan Limited. Following this, Photron continued to manufacture and sell high-speed cameras in Asia while seeking opportunities to expand its sensor technology into other regions. The company entered into an agreement with Eastman Kodak MASD to produce two high-speed cameras, the HS 4540 and the Kodak Ektapro Motioncorder. These products were marketed by Kodak in Europe, North America, and parts of Asia until 2000, when Photron assumed worldwide responsibility. The HS 4540 was subsequently rebranded as the Photron FASTCAM SE, and the Motioncorder as the Photron FASTCAM Super 10K.

Photron opened an office in Fukuoka City in 1994 and became a publicly traded company in September 1997, offering shares over the counter. That year, the company also began sales of the SLSM Super Slow Motion System, produced by Belgian company EVS. In January 2000, Photron established Photron USA in San Jose, California. The company acquired I-Chips Technology Limited in June 2000 and established Photron Europe Limited in the United Kingdom in April 2001. Later that year, Photron Vietnam Technical Center Limited was also founded.

The company received ISO 9001:2000 certification for product quality in 2002 and relocated its head office and Ebina Plant to Fujimi, Chiyoda-ku, Tokyo, in 2003. In 2007, it created a medical imaging subsidiary, Photron Medical Imaging Inc. Photron's ISO status was updated to ISO 9001:2008 in 2010.

=== 2011–2024 ===
In 2011, Photron became a wholly owned subsidiary of IMAGICA Robot Holdings, a Japanese company traditionally engaged in film processing. Photron merged with IMAGICA DIGIX Inc. in 2012.

In late 2013, Photron Inc. in San Diego introduced the FASTCAM Mini UX100 high-speed camera for ballistics testing and other applications. The FASTCAM Mini AX200 was released in 2016.

As of 2020, the company's president was Takashi Takimizu, and its head office was located in the Jimbocho Mitsui Building, Chiyoda-ku, Tokyo. That year, Photron acquired Photonic Lattice, Inc. Further acquisitions included TRASC, TASKEE, and ISLWARE in 2021, and Media Solutions, Inc. in 2022.

Since 2011, Photron has operated as a wholly owned subsidiary and business unit of IMAGICA GROUP Inc. (formerly Imagica Robot Holdings), collaborating in fields such as color science, broadcast applications, and image processing.

== Cameras and applications ==
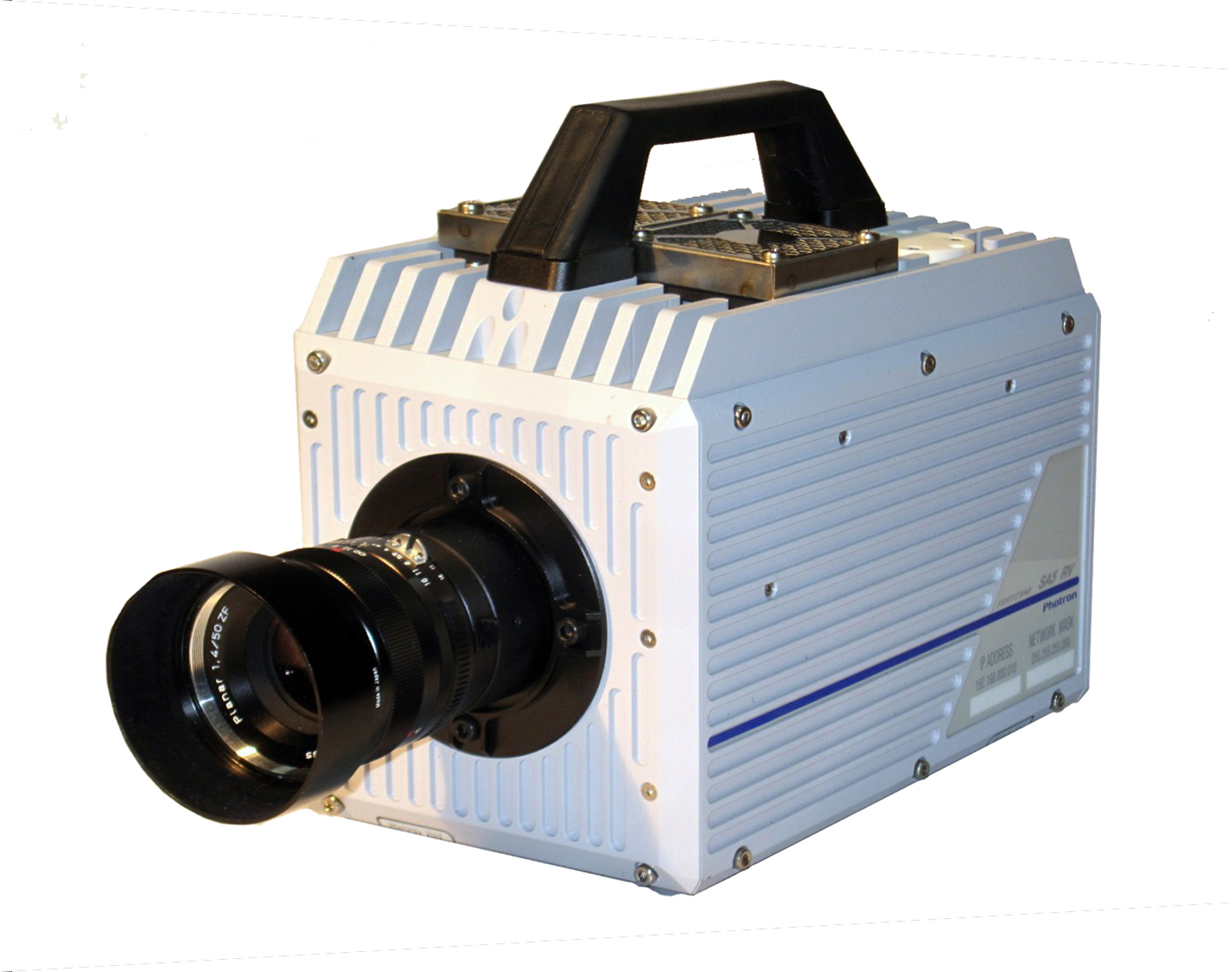
The FASTCAM SA5-RV Digital High-Speed Camera is a 1 megapixel, 12-bit camera recording at 7,500 fps.

In the past decade, Photron has introduced advancements in high-speed imaging technology, with some camera models capable of recording at over 2.1 million frames per second at various resolutions. Photron high-speed cameras range from 20,000 fps at 1024 × 1024 pixels with 12-bit resolution to ultra high-speed models exceeding 2.1 million fps. They are employed by designers, manufacturers, and test engineers for motion analysis, which enables the study of details and phenomena not visible in real-time. The cameras vary in size, resolution, and frame rate. For example, the SA5-RV model is designed for use in environments with high heat or vibration, addressing conditions that may be unsuitable for conventional camera systems.

Photron has produced a number of camera models, some of which are listed below.

=== FASTCAM Super 10K ===
The Photron FASTCAM Super 10K is a 512 × 480 high-speed camera, part of the FASTCAM line introduced in 1996. The Super 10K was released in 2000 but had previously been marketed under a KODAK MASD trade brand in 1992. The Kodak Motioncorder and the Photron FASTCAM Super 10K are technically the same camera under different trade names.

The camera's native resolution is 512 × 480 pixels at 8 bits and 250 fps. By reducing resolution, the frame rate could be increased: for example, 1000 fps at 256 × 240 pixels or 10,000 fps at 128 × 34 pixels. The Super 10K was available with three memory options—128 MB, 384 MB, or 512 MB—allowing up to 8.73 seconds of record time at 250 fps with maximum capacity. Data could be transferred through a SCSI interface, while live video output was compatible with NTSC or PAL monitors. Ancillary information appeared as on-screen data (OSD). The system allowed cable lengths of up to 16 metres between the processor and camera head, and control was possible via computer using RS-232 ASCII commands.

According to the manufacturer, more than 4,000 units of the Motioncorder/Super 10K were produced between 1996 and 2005.

=== FASTCAM Ultima 40K ===
The Photron FASTCAM Ultima 40K is a 256 × 256 high-speed camera, also part of the FASTCAM line. Released in 2000, it had previously been marketed in 1992 as a Kodak MASD product. The Kodak HS4540 and the Photron Ultima 40K are the same camera under different branding.

The Ultima 40K has been used in ballistic studies, airbag design and qualification, combustion research, and flow visualization, including aerosol dispersion. Several versions of this system were manufactured between 1990 and 2006 under different names, including the Photron Rabbit, Kodak HS4540, Photron Ultima 40K, and Photron FASTCAM SE, all of which used the same image sensor.

=== FASTCAM SE ===
The Photron FASTCAM SE is a 256 × 256 high-speed camera in the FASTCAM line. It was released in 2000 but had previously been distributed under the Kodak MASD brand in 1992 as the Kodak HS4540. The SE and HS4540 are identical apart from branding.

=== FASTCAM Spectra ===
The Photron FASTCAM Spectra is a 256 × 256 high-speed camera coupled with an image intensifier. The intensifier can shutter down to 20 nanoseconds and has a spectral response from 180 nm to 800 nm. The Spectra was introduced in 1998 as part of the FASTCAM line.

=== FASTCAM Ultima 512 ===
The Photron FASTCAM Ultima 512 is a 512 × 512 high-speed camera in the FASTCAM line. It was introduced in 2001.

== See also ==
- Open Design Alliance
- High speed photography
- Electronics industry in Japan
