= Geodimeter =

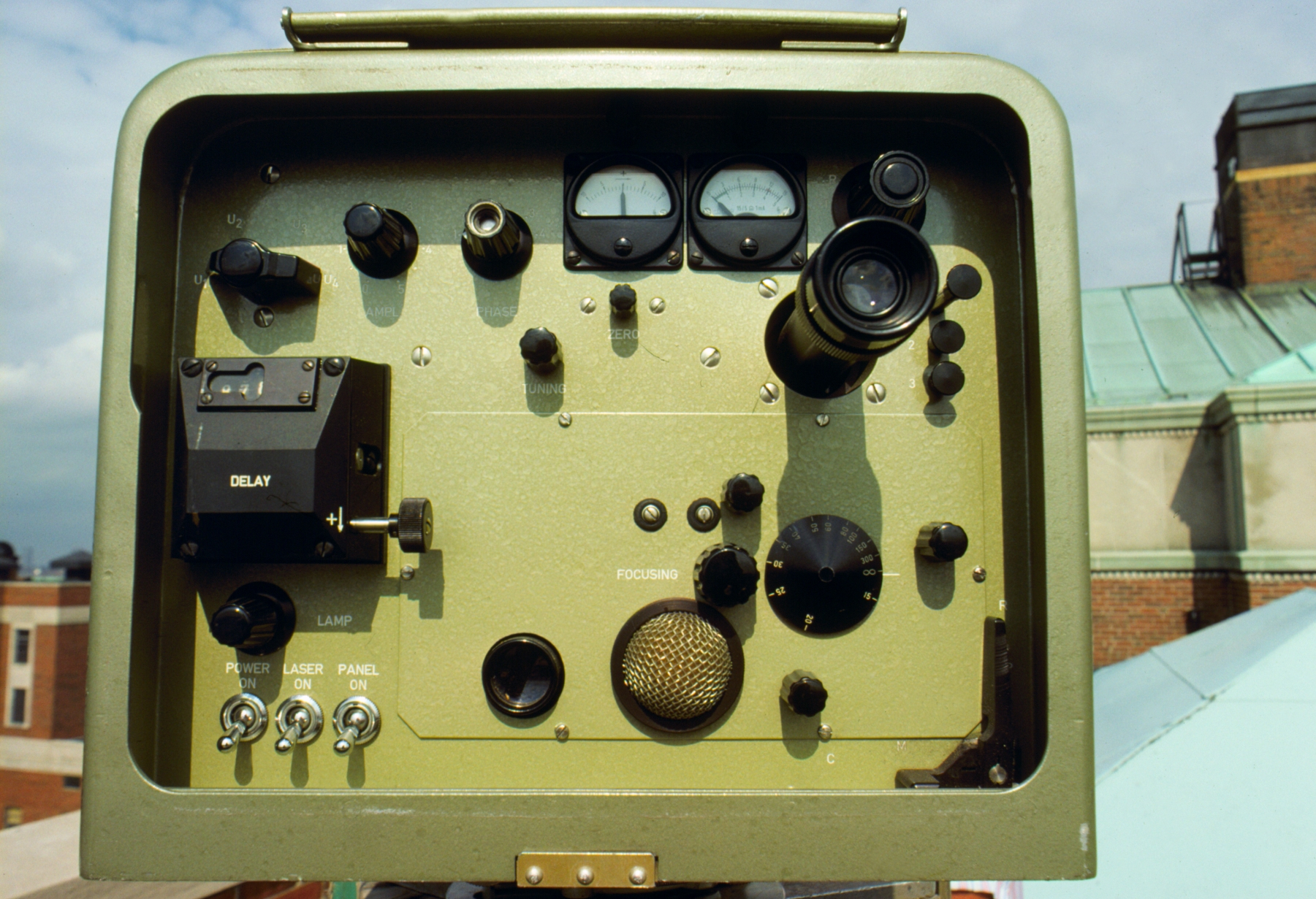
Operator controls and sight of a Geodimeter

The Geodimeter (acronym of geodetic distance meter) was the first optical electronic distance meter surveying instrument. It was originally developed for measuring the speed of light. It was invented in 1947 by Erik Osten Bergstrand and commercialized in 1953 by the AGA (Aktiebolaget Gasaccumulator) company of Sweden. It was used in the Transcontinental Traverse.

The Geodimeter business was acquired by SpectraPrecision which was acquired by Trimble Inc.

== Electronic mechanism ==
The mechanism uses a Kerr cell shutter in an optical train that chops a collimated beam of light under the control of a precision electronic oscillator in the megahertz range. It is similar in principle to the mechanical chopper in Fizeau's measurement of the speed of light in air that used a toothed wheel.

== See also ==
- Laser rangefinder
- Lidar
- Tellurometer
