= Kerr cell shutter =

High-speed photographic shutter

The Kerr cell comprises a transparent container (A) filled with nitrobenzene (B) with electrodes (C and D) attached to it; when an electric field is applied perpendicular to a transmitted light beam, the nitrobenzene becomes birefringent

A Kerr cell shutter is a type of photographic shutter used for very fast shutter speeds down to nanosecond level.

The Kerr cell consists of a transparent container (A) filled with nitrobenzene (B) with attached electrodes (C and D). A high voltage is passed through the electrodes which causes an electric field perpendicular to the transmitted light beam to be applied.

The cell makes use of the Kerr effect, in which the nitrobenzene becomes birefringent under the influence of the electric field. This allows it to be used as a shutter that can be opened for a very brief amount of time, around 10 ns.

Its primary disadvantage was the use of toxic and flammable substances such as nitrobenzene and o-nitrotoluene. These have now largely been replaced by KTN (potassium tantalate niobate) and barium titanate (BaTiO_{3}).

== Speed of light measurement ==
The Kerr cell shutter was used in the 1920-40s to measure the speed of light. A beam of light is timed between an emitter and receiver while passing through a Kerr cell. When the cell is activated the light beam is diverted and takes a different path to the receiver. This time difference is measured and the speed of light is calculated based on knowledge of the expected return time.

== See also ==
- Geodimeter
- Rapatronic camera
