= Rapatronic camera =

High-speed camera with an exposure time as brief as 10 nanoseconds

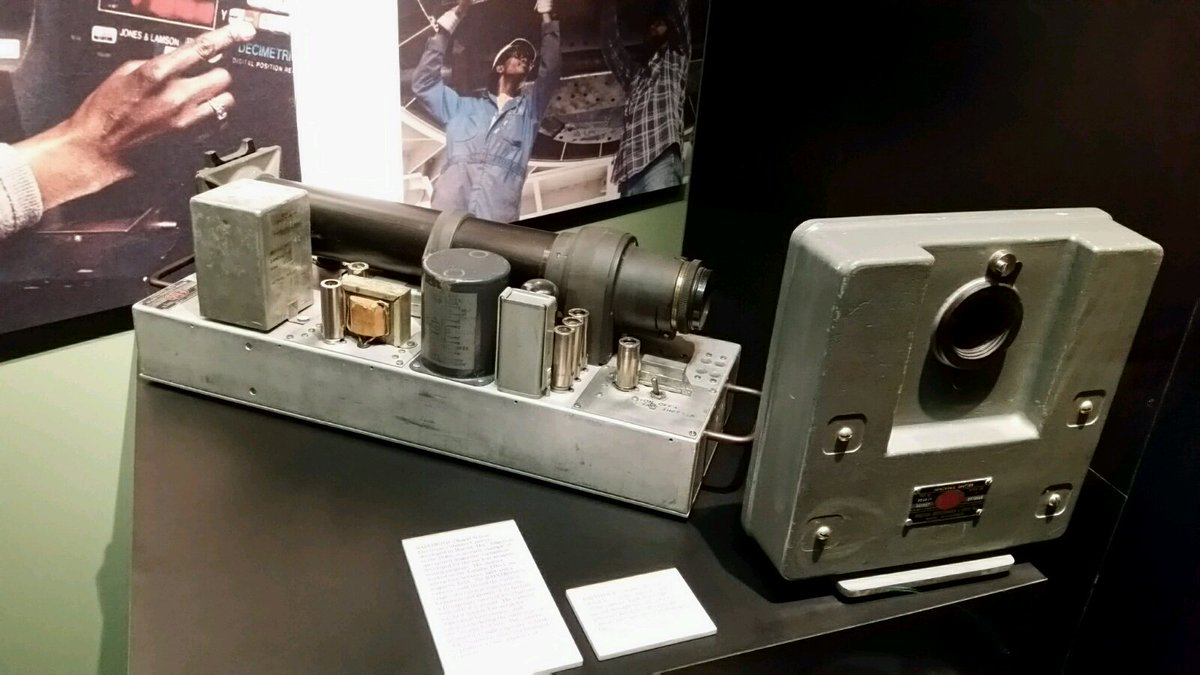
Original Rapatronic Camera on display at the National Atomic Testing Museum in Las Vegas, NV.

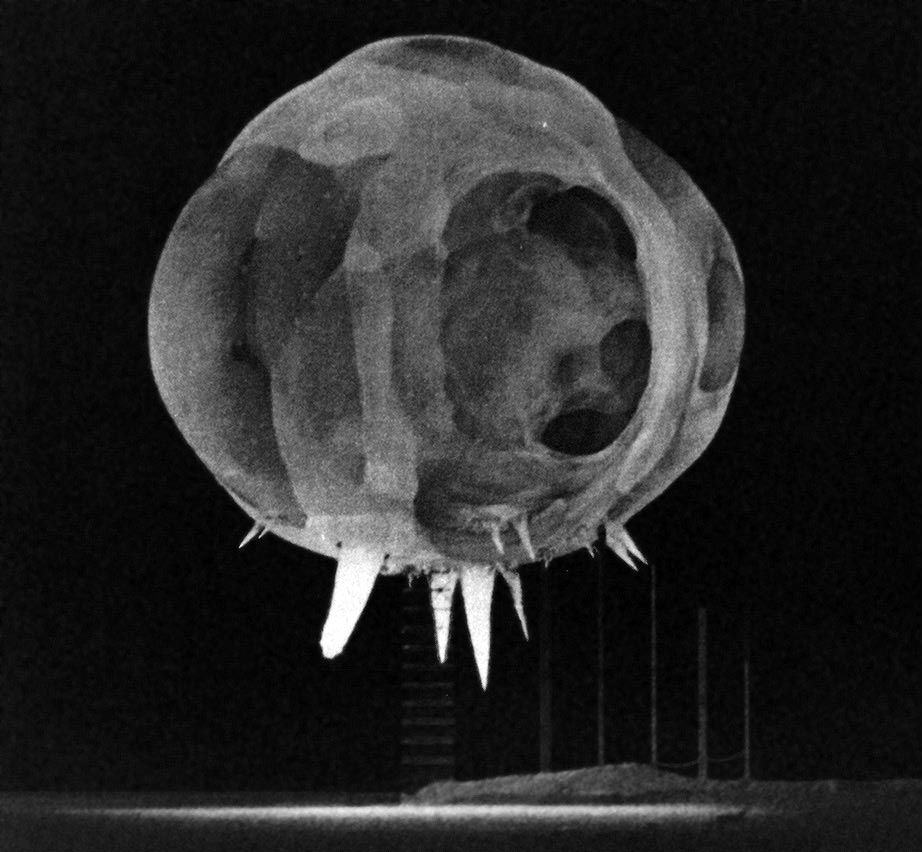
Nuclear explosion from the Tumbler-Snapper test series in Nevada, circa 1952 photographed by a rapatronic camera less than 1 millisecond after detonation. In this shot, the fireball is about 20 m (66 ft) across. The spikes at the bottom of the fireball are known as the rope trick effect.

The rapatronic camera (a portmanteau of rapid action electronic) is a high-speed camera capable of recording a still image with an exposure time as brief as 10 nanoseconds.

The camera was developed by Harold Edgerton in the 1940s and was first used to photograph the rapidly changing matter in nuclear explosions within milliseconds of detonation, using exposures of several microseconds. To overcome the speed limitation of a conventional camera's mechanical shutter, the rapatronic camera uses two polarizing filters and a Faraday cell (or in some variants a Kerr cell). The two filters are mounted with their polarization angles at 90° to each other, to block all incoming light. The Faraday cell sits between the filters and changes the polarization plane of light passing through it depending on the level of magnetic field applied, acting as a shutter when it is energized at the right time for a very short amount of time, allowing the film to be properly exposed.

In magneto-optical shutters, the active material of the Faraday cell (e.g., dense flint glass, which reacts well to a strong magnetic field) is located inside an electromagnet coil, formed by a few loops of thick wire. The coil is powered from a pulse forming network by discharging a high-voltage capacitor (e.g., 2 microfarads at 1000 volts), into the coil via a trigatron or a thyratron switch. In electro-optical shutters, the active material is a liquid, typically nitrobenzene, located in a cell between two electrodes. A brief impulse of high voltage is applied to rotate the polarization of the passing light.

For a film-like sequence of high-speed photographs, as used in the photography of nuclear and thermonuclear tests, arrays of up to 12 cameras were deployed, with each camera carefully timed to record sequentially. Each camera was capable of recording only one exposure on a single sheet of film. Therefore, in order to create slow motion images, banks of four to ten cameras were set up to take photos in rapid succession. The average exposure time used was a single microsecond.

== See also ==
- Kerr cell shutter
