= Mikrotron-GmbH =

Mikrotron GmbH
- Industry: High-speed camera solutions
- Founded: 1976 in Eching, Germany
- Founders: Bernhard Mindermann and Andreas Stockhausen
- Headquarters: Unterschleißheim, Germany; San Diego, CA (USA)
- Products: High-Speed Recording Cameras, High-Speed Recording Systems, Machine Vision Cameras, Vision PCs and Services
- Number of employees: 35
- Website: www.mikrotron.de/en

Mikrotron GmbH develops, produces, distributes, and rents high-speed cameras, recording systems, software and image processing components. The company, based near Munich, Germany, employs about 35 people, and has 35 distributors operating in over 30 countries.

== History ==
Mikrotron Digital Microcomputer and Analog Technology GmbH was established by Bernhard Mindermann and Andreas Stockhausen, two Kontron AG employees, in 1976 in Eching, near Munich, Germany, and entered into the commercial registry on January 19, 1977, to develop microcomputer programs, devices and systems. The Mikrotron name is derived from Kontron. In the 1980s, the company supplied data logging systems that can input data into other systems. The company continued to grow and evolve, as they developed customized electronic data logging systems. The company began integrating machine vision into bonding machines in 1990, and integrated specialized video frame grabbers into high resolution cameras in the mid-1990s, as well as recording systems, consisting of a portable PC, external cameras, frame grabbers and software, which evolved into the company's current Long Time Recording Systems. Mikrotron launched its first high-speed camera in 1997, which recorded at a rate of 400 fps with a resolution of 1024 x 1024 pixels. These high-speed cameras were also integrated into the company's recording systems. In the late 2000s, the company's integrated FPGA (Field Programmable Gate Arrays) programming and custom frame grabbers within their cameras helped solve the latency problem with the GigE interface. The company is ISO 9001:2008 certified (1/2014).

== Products and applications ==
Mikrotron cameras capture images from 1.1 up to 25 MPixel resolution and frame rates from several hundred to more than 250,000 frames per second (fps). They are used for process optimization, quality testing, engineering and motion analysis. Mikrotron develops and designs all of the hard- and software that is used in its high-speed imaging products. Its own electronic manufacturing department produces the circuit boards using surface mount technology and assembles the cameras. The EoSens 25CXP, a 25 Mpixel CoaXPress camera, won the “Product of the Year” award from the electronics portal electroniknet.de. In 2015, Mikrotron was awarded a Top Job Award for its exceptional leadership qualities.
