= Air-gap flash =

Photographic light source capable of producing sub-microsecond light flashes

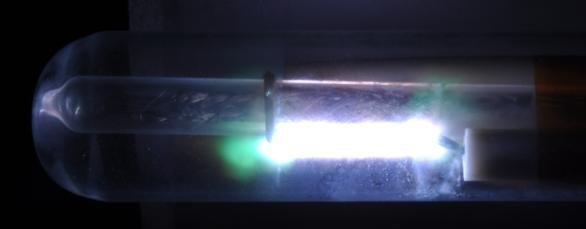
Spark between anode and cathode, triggered by the third electrode inside the inner quartz tube. The inner tube serves as a guide for the spark and to cool it even faster. The outer tube muffles the explosive sound that the spark produces.

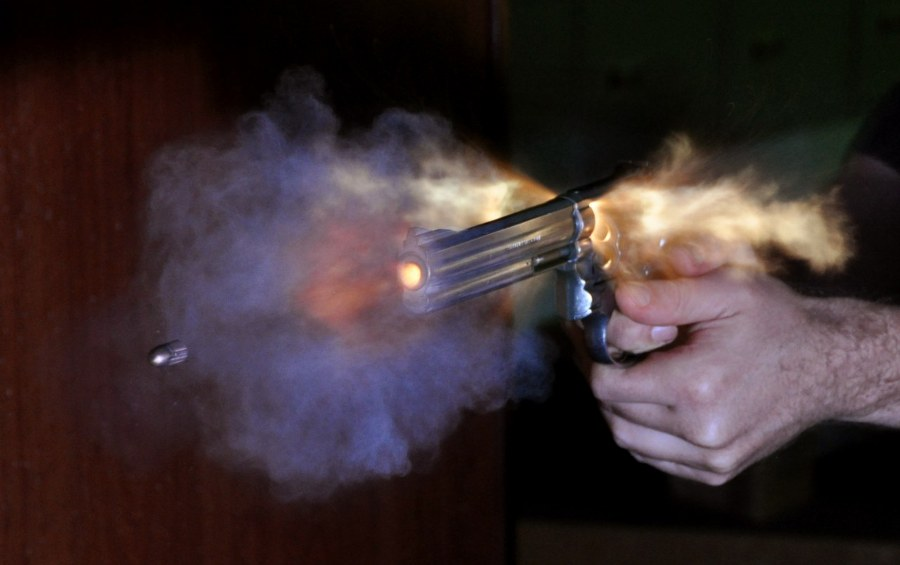
A photo of a Smith & Wesson Model 686 firing, taken with the flash above. The photo was taken in a darkened room, with the camera's shutter open, and the flash was triggered by the sound of the shot using a microphone.

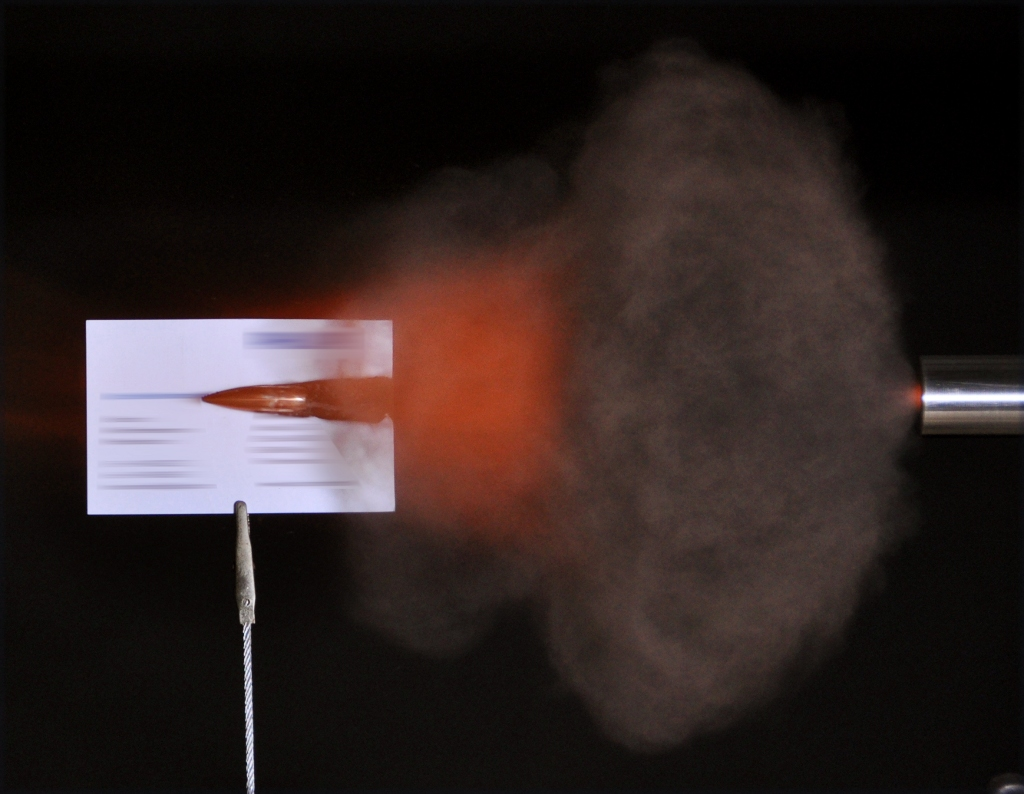
Ultra-high-speed photo of a bullet travelling at about 870 metres per second (2,850 ft/s).

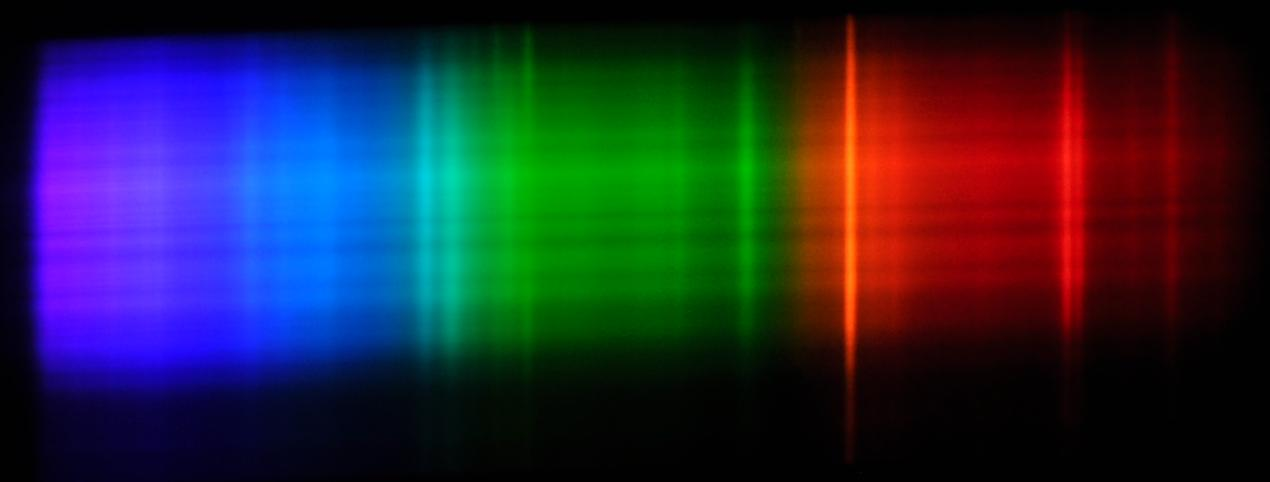
Air-gap flash spectrum generated with a grating.

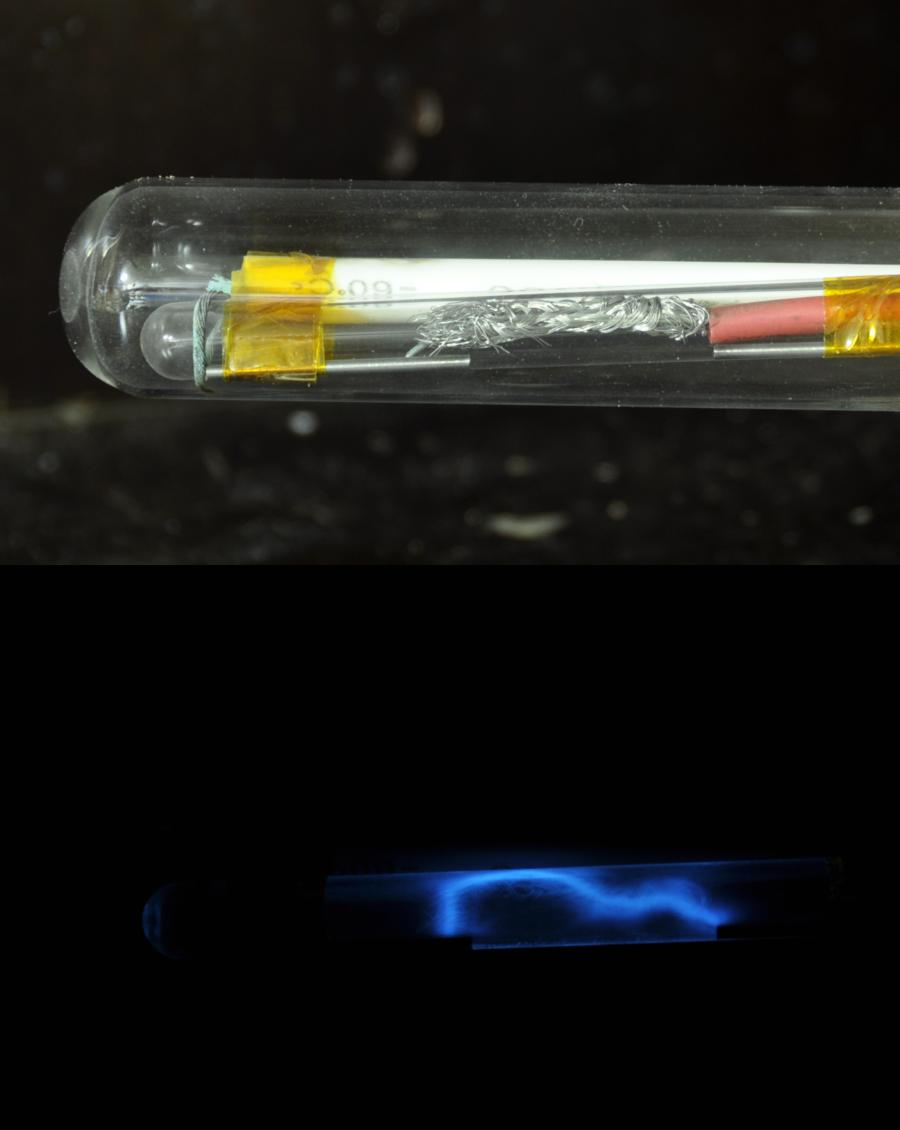
Upper half shows the air-gap in daylight. Lower half shows the phosphorescence of the quartz ignition tube in blue in a darkened environment after a flash has occurred.

An air-gap flash is a photographic light source capable of producing sub-microsecond light flashes, allowing for (ultra) high-speed photography. This is achieved by a high-voltage (20 kV typically) electric discharge between two electrodes over the surface of a quartz (or glass) tube. The distance between the electrodes is such that a spontaneous discharge does not occur. To start the discharge a high-voltage pulse (70 kV for example) is applied on an electrode inside the quartz tube.

The flash can be triggered electronically by being synchronised with an electronic detection device such as a microphone or an interrupted laser beam in order to illuminate a fast event. A sub-microsecond flash is fast enough to photographically capture a supersonic bullet in flight without noticeable motion blur.

== History ==
The person credited with popularising the flash is Harold Eugene Edgerton, though the earlier scientist Ernst Mach also used a spark gap as a fast photographic lighting system. William Henry Fox Talbot is said to have created the first spark-based flash photo, using a Leyden jar, the original form of the capacitor. Edgerton was one of the founders of EG&G company who sold an air-gap flash under the name Microflash 549. There are several commercial flashes available today.

== Design parameters ==
The aim of a high-speed flash is to be very fast and yet bright enough for adequate exposure. An air-gap flash system typically consists of a capacitor that is discharged through a gas (air in this case). The speed of a flash is mainly determined by the time it takes to discharge the capacitor through the gas. This time is proportional to

$t_{discharge} \propto {\sqrt{LC}}$,

in which L is the inductance and C the capacitance of the system. To be fast, both L and C must be kept small.

The brightness of the flash is proportional to the energy stored in the capacitor:

$E = {{CV^2} \over 2}$,

where V is the voltage across the capacitor. This shows that high brightness calls for a large capacitance and a high voltage. However, since a large capacitance would have a relatively long discharge time that would make the flash slow, the only practical solution is to use a very high voltage on a relatively small capacitor, with a very low inductance. Typical values are 0.05 µF capacitance, 0.02 µH inductance, 10 J energy, 0.5 µs duration and about 20 MW power.

Air (mainly nitrogen) is preferred as a gas because it is fast. Although xenon has a much higher efficiency in converting energy into light, xenon (because of its afterglow) cannot achieve a flash pulse duration less than about 10 microseconds.

The spark is guided over a quartz surface to improve the light output and benefit from the cooling capacity, making the flash faster. This has a negative effect in the form of quartz erosion because of high energy discharge.

== Spectral properties ==
Since the spark gap discharges in air generating a plasma, the spectrum shows both a continuum and spectral lines, mainly of nitrogen since air is 79% nitrogen. The spectrum is rich in UV but covers the entire visible range down to infra-red. When a quartz tube is used as ignition tube, it shows a clear phosphorescence in blue after the flash, induced by the UV.
