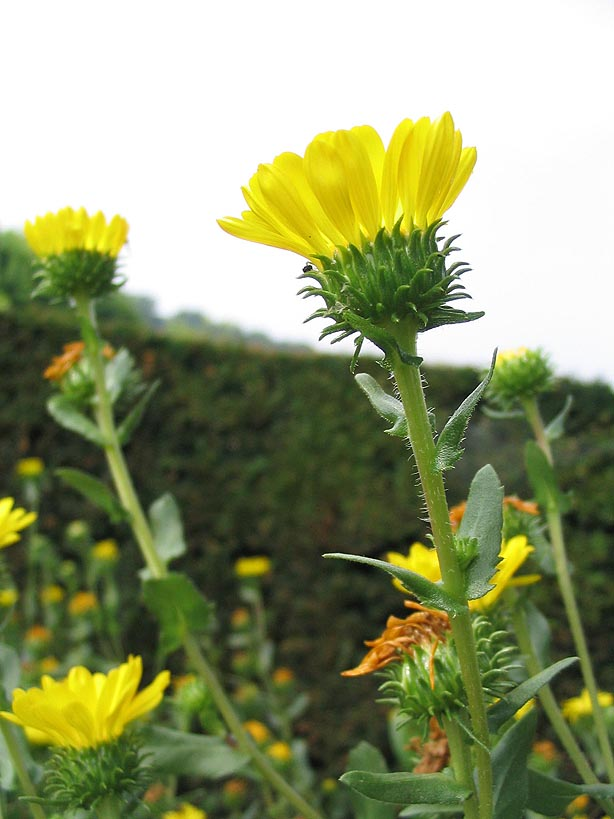

Scientific classification
- Kingdom: Plantae
- Clade: Tracheophytes
- Clade: Angiosperms
- Clade: Eudicots
- Clade: Asterids
- Order: Asterales
- Family: Asteraceae
- Genus: Grindelia
- Species: G. camporum

Binomial name
- Grindelia camporum Greene

= Grindelia camporum =

Species of flowering plant

Grindelia camporum is a species of flowering plant in the daisy family known by the common names Great Valley gumplant and Great Valley gumweed.

== Distribution ==
The plant is native to California and Baja California, where it can be found in a number of habitats including chaparral and woodlands. Its range may extend into Nevada. It is hardy plant that also readily grows in disturbed and altered areas such as ditches and roadsides.

== Description ==
Grindelia camporum is a gangly perennial topping 2 m (6 ft.) in maximum height. Its erect, branching stems are lined with many stiff, wavy-edged, serrated leaves 2 to 3 cm long.

Atop the stem branches are inflorescences of a single large flower head up to 3 cm wide. The head is a vaguely thistlelike cup of green clawlike phyllaries that bend downward. The centre of the head is filled with yellow disc florets and there are usually many yellow ray florets around the circumference. The flower head fills with a copious white exudate, especially during the early stages of blooming.

== Uses ==
It is a traditional Native American medicinal plant, used by the Indigenous peoples of California.

It is grown horticulturally in sunny, dry gardens in California, where it blooms in profusion during spring, attracting many species of insects, butterflies, and beetles. It goes dormant during the summer. Its seeds are a food source for many songbirds.
