= David Gunness =

American audio engineer (born 1960)

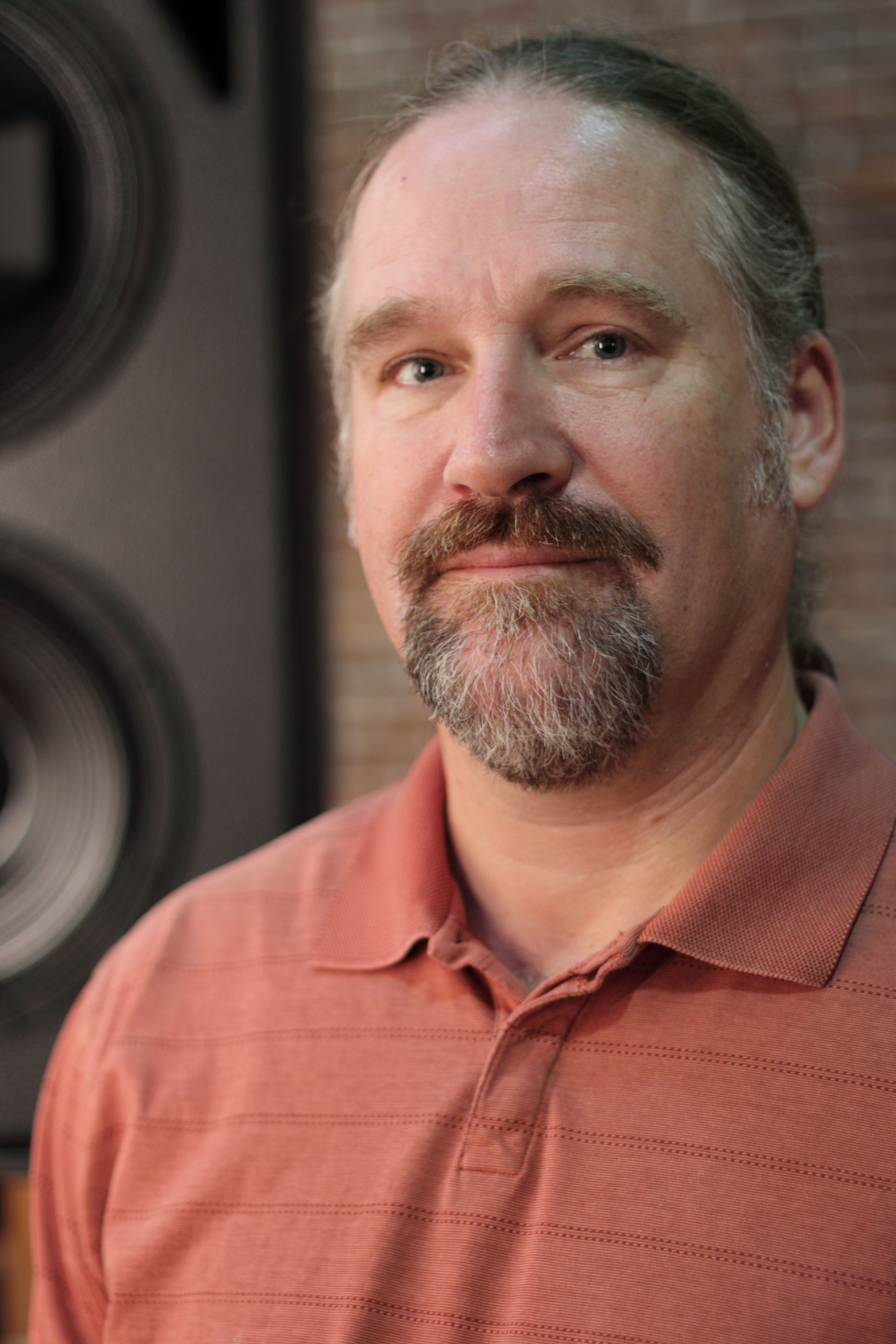
- Self-portrait photograph
- Born: November 7, 1960 (age 65)
- Occupations: Audio engineer, electrical engineer and inventor
- Employer(s): Electro-Voice; Eastern Acoustic Works; Fulcrum Acoustic
- Title: 1995–present
- Website: http://www.fulcrum-acoustic.com

David W. Gunness (born November 7, 1960) is an American audio engineer, electrical engineer and inventor. He is known for his work on loudspeaker design, especially high-output professional horn loudspeakers for public address, studio, theater, nightclub, concert and touring uses.

Gunness worked with Electro-Voice in Michigan for 11 years, filing three patents related to horn technology. He worked at Eastern Acoustic Works (EAW) in Massachusetts for 12 years, filing three patents in the process of creating a wide variety of loudspeaker products. For EAW, Gunness developed "Gunness Focusing"—a system for decreasing temporal response distortion in loudspeakers, involving the processing of the audio signal before it reaches the loudspeaker drivers, applying a reverse image of the expected distortion to cancel out the loudspeaker's idiosyncrasies. Gunness co-founded Fulcrum Acoustic in 2008: a loudspeaker company with the aim of designing loudspeakers based on digital signal processing (DSP), innovative components and high quality construction.

== Early life ==
Gunness was born November 7, 1960; he grew up in Janesville, Wisconsin, enjoying outdoor activities such as bicycling, camping, hunting and fishing. At Joseph A. Craig High School he participated in gymnastics and played guitar. Two of his sisters entered the University of Wisconsin–Madison (UW-Madison), but Gunness chose Purdue University in Indiana. After one year there, he returned to Wisconsin to enroll at UW-Madison as an electrical engineering major. During his college years he made extra money as a musician; singing and playing acoustic guitar. For these gigs he fabricated his own loudspeakers, and he determined to continue in this field, shifting his studies to focus on acoustics and electronics. In June 1984, Gunness graduated UW-Madison with a degree in Electrical and Computer Engineering. He immediately accepted an engineering job in Buchanan, Michigan, and relocated there. On September 29, 1984, he married Kathryn A. Sessions, a nursing student who had finished one year ahead of him at UW-Madison.

== Electro-Voice ==
Gunness's first patent, a manifold of cast zinc combining four compression drivers into one horn

Directly after graduating UW-Madison, Gunness obtained a research and development position in the engineering department at the Electro-Voice (EV) factory in Michigan. Under Chief Engineer Ray Newman, Gunness worked on loudspeaker design, combining traditional empirical R&D methodologies with the emerging capabilities of computer analysis. His first assignment was to help develop the Musicaster 100, an all-weather 2-way coaxial loudspeaker; an update of the classic 1959 Musicaster design.

In 1984, Gunness filed a patent for a better way to use a manifold to combine the outputs of multiple compression drivers for increased sound power level (SPL), using two to four flat reflecting surfaces in the throat of a horn to redirect sound waves for a more coherent summation. This low-distortion manifold design made it possible for EV to produce its first high-power concert and touring loudspeaker: the MT-4, with "MT" standing for "Manifold Technology". This was a 4-way system split between two enclosures, with four speaker drivers summed in each bandpass; a total of 16 drivers. The upper two bandpasses used the Gunness manifold design for compression drivers, each manifold formed of two zinc castings. The medium low frequencies were carried by four 10-inch (250 mm) cone drivers summed using a larger embodiment of the Gunness manifold concept based on ray tracing and reflection. The MT-4 was a very heavy system at 633 pounds (287 kg), but it put more power into a smaller package, and it was quicker to position and connect. The MT-4 proved popular, used on major tours and festivals such as the 1995 Monsters of Rock at Donington Park in central England and the main stage of the 1996 Lollapalooza tour featuring Metallica and Soundgarden. Together, EV engineer David Carlson and Gunness presented a paper to the Audio Engineering Society (AES) in November 1986, describing the methods they used to sum four drivers in each bandpass.

In 1986, Gunness developed the EV HP series of horn loudspeakers based on the constant directivity (CD) characteristics described by EV engineer Don Keele in the mid-1970s. Gunness recognized that relatively large 2-inch (51 mm) horn throats, commonly used for greater SPL, produced an undesirable narrowing of the output pattern above 10 kHz. His patented design used two longitudinal ribs or vanes to form three "pseudo horns" within the horn flare.

In 1989, Gunness developed an asymmetric horn with an output pattern shaped to suit a typical small-to-mid-sized rectangular auditorium with people sitting near the enclosure hearing sound that was not too loud and others sitting farther away hearing sound that was loud enough. In both cases, the sound pattern was to minimize sound energy bouncing off of walls; reflections creating unwanted multi-path cancellations. The horn featured a vertical diffraction slot that was narrower at the bottom which reduced the output for people sitting below the enclosure in the nearfield, and increased the output for those sitting farther away. EV's sister company, Altec Lansing, marketed this product as the "Vari-Intense" horn.

Gunness researched automated methods for analyzing the performance of a loudspeaker. In 1990 he delivered a paper to the AES describing a system which used pink noise and a filtered receiver to generate polar response curves plotting loudspeaker output patterns.

== Eastern Acoustic Works ==
In September 1995, Gunness moved his family, now including a son and a daughter, from Michigan to Massachusetts in response to his taking a position as senior engineer at Eastern Acoustic Works (EAW) in Whitinsville. His first task was to set up a system for creating custom loudspeaker designs for specific clients and purposes, and he performed much field work, tuning and optimizing loudspeaker installations. He then began to research the concept of phased point source behavior with the goal of controlling the directional characteristics of a high-powered concert loudspeaker cluster. This work led to the development of EAW's KF900 series concert touring system. In 1997 he filed two patents related to this research: one for a downfill loudspeaker that would direct sound downward without being rigged differently than its upper neighbors, and a method for creating a "common acoustical wavefront" of horizontally arrayed loudspeaker horns mounted in trapezoid enclosures which placed the acoustic center of the array very close to the rear of the enclosure. The horn mouths minimized diffraction between enclosures. The KF900 system incorporated digital signal processing (DSP) for each horizontal row of drivers in the loudspeaker cluster. Gunness said that bringing the DSP to fruition by way of rigorous mathematical performance analysis was a "massive undertaking" which gave him a broad foundation of computer analysis techniques he would draw from in later inventions. The KF900 was deployed in mid-1998 for 11 Promise Keepers tour dates, and its response was measured during the shows as part of an iterative product optimization plan. In 2001, Eric Clapton used the KF900 system while touring in support of his Reptile album. In his work to predict the performance of various KF900 loudspeaker configurations, Gunness used acoustical measurement and modeling software called FChart that he started developing while still at Electro-Voice. Heinz Field, home of the Pittsburgh Steelers football team received an installed KF900 system, as did Fenway Park, home of the Boston Red Sox baseball team. The final system tuning at Fenway was performed using Smaart software.

Gunness also designed the following EAW loudspeaker models: the long-throw MH433 trapezoid with rigging points, the install-only BH822 twin 12-inch "super" subwoofer, the LA400 touring subwoofer, and the large format arrayable MQ series.

=== Gunness Focusing ===
For years, Gunness had been looking for various electronic solutions to the undesirable characteristics of horns. At EV in 1985, Gunness noticed the performance differences between various shapes of horns, and theorized that an electronic filter might allow optimization. In early 1995, EV gained access to Altec Lansing's 1987 Acousta-CADD acoustic modeling software which revealed more loudspeaker performance characteristics than had previously been observed, but DSP programming tools were still inadequate for audio signal correction. In 2000, Greek electroacousticians John Mourjopoulos and Panagiotis 'Panos' Hatziantoniou described a method for smoothing precise audio analysis filters. Building on this work, Gunness led a team of EAW engineers to develop a proprietary wavelet transform spectrogram for internal research. The EAW spectrogram reduced visual complexity by applying a zero-phase-shift low-pass filter to the audio signal under test using mirror-image infinite impulse response (IIR) filters. The spectrogram revealed loudspeaker performance anomalies, allowing the engineering team to identify mechanisms they characterized as "two-port systems"; i.e. mechanisms demonstrating a single input, a single transfer function, and a single output. Such two-port systems were of interest because they could possibly be corrected with electronic filtering. Because of their variability the methodology would not be used on any of the mechanisms which appeared to be non-linear relative to signal level, spatial distribution ("coverage"), or over time, such as cone stiffness or surround compliance. This left several substantial "linear, time-invariant" (LTI) mechanisms that would yield to correction by digital filtering. These included 1) time-smear from the compression driver/phase plug interface, 2) horn resonance, 3) cone resonance, and 4) crossover phase linearity between adjacent bandpasses. In April 2005, EAW announced the NT Series, a line of 2-way bi-amplified self-powered loudspeakers incorporating the "new technology" which was initially called "Digital Transduction Correction" (DTC). Mix magazine quoted Gunness identifying compression driver "time smear" as a longstanding loudspeaker problem that was countered by preconditioning in the audio signal. Later that year, EAW dropped the DTC acronym and began promoting the technology as "Gunness Focusing".

At the AES convention in October 2005 in New York City, EAW project engineer William "Bill" Hoy and Gunness presented a paper describing the mathematics of the spectrogram. At the same convention, Gunness spoke about the research and development which culminated in the new technology. He described how the spectrogram allowed the EAW engineering team to observe the mechanism of time smear occurring in the small space between the compression driver diaphragm and the phase plug. He discovered that only half of the compression driver's energy, at best, goes directly from the diaphragm through a phase plug slot or port and into the horn throat. The rest of the sound waves either reflect back to the compression driver surface or travel to another phase plug slot or port; in both cases the result is wave energy leaving the phase plug after the initial impulse. Gunness modeled this behavior mathematically and applied an inverted signal to cancel out the later wave energy. Gunness filed a patent for the technology in March 2006. Later that year, EAW introduced the UX8800, a DSP-based loudspeaker management system with four inputs and eight outputs. The UX8800 was offered to allow Gunness Focusing to be applied to selected pre-existing EAW products such as the KF700 line array series. Gunness Focusing was nominated for but did not win a TEC Award in 2006.

=== Line arrays ===
Gunness joined with EAW co-founder Kenton Forsythe and engineer Jeff Rocha to design the KF760 and KF730 series line array systems. The KF760 was a full-size 3-way system and the KF730 was a compact 3-way system. Either system could be augmented with ground-stacked or flown subwoofers. Common to the two different sizes of KF700 series products was the principal of "divergence shading" rather than the more usual intensity shading. The vertical output pattern of the individual line array elements was adjusted to optimize SPL received by near- and far-field audience areas. This method avoided what Gunness said was a discontinuity between adjacent loudspeaker enclosures driven at different signal levels; he observed smeared transients and frequency response problems. Gunness wrote about divergence shading and general line array issues in August 2000. The KF760 product was revealed in May 2001. The major concerts using the KF760s included The Boston Globe's Jazz and Blues Festival in 2001, Usher's 2002 Evolution tour, Pearl Jam's 2003 Riot Act Tour, the North American dates of Iron Maiden's 2003 Give Me Ed... 'Til I'm Dead Tour, and Sir Paul McCartney playing in Moscow's Red Square in 2003. Usher also used flown KF761 boxes for his vocal stage monitoring system; monitor engineer Maceo Price and sound company owner Tim Cain sat down with Gunness and Rocha, looking at prediction software results to determine which EAW product line would best suit the purpose of loud monitors that would not be in the way of Usher's dancing and set changes. By late 2006, the KF760 and KF730 line array products had been augmented with optional Gunness Focusing by way of the UX8800 loudspeaker management system. THC Audio in Sofia used the UX8800/KF760 combination for Snoop Dogg's Bulgarian performance in 2008.

Gunness appeared as a panelist at an AES line array tutorial and workshop in October 2002, held in Los Angeles. Don Keele, whose 1970s CD horn discoveries formed a basis for Gunness's later research, shared the panel. In October 2003, Gunness wrote an article about "Digitally Steerable Array" (DSA) technology for Live Sound International magazine. He expanded on the DSA concept the next month for the British Institute of Acoustics (IOA). DSA allowed for adjustments to the vertical output width and vertical direction of a column of mid- to high-frequency loudspeaker drivers, in a frequency range from about 500 Hz to 16 kHz; a range critical to voice intelligibility. Gunness wrote that his research into DSA began in the 1990s and was largely based on the observations gained in developing the KF900 series. The proprietary FChart software was leveraged to create "DSA Pilot" to supply prediction and adjustment software for DSA installations. DSA Pilot allowed the installer to change the vertical pattern of a DSA product from 15 to 120 degrees high, and to change the main direction up or down by 30 degrees, without changing the position of the enclosure. Gunness told the IOA that each transducer in the vertical column must have its own DSP and amplifier for proper steering of the output pattern. For high frequency control, physically small drivers are required. One of the benefits of DSA was that the loudspeaker enclosure could be mounted flat against a vertical wall rather than tilted. The flat position eliminated the problem of acoustic energy radiating from the back of the enclosure, smearing the forward output with multi-path arrival times.

In February 2000, Mackie Designs bought EAW but retained the EAW brand. In 2003, Mackie Designs changed its name to LOUD Technologies and moved previously Seattle-based Mackie manufacturing to Asia. In late 2006, LOUD moved EAW's loudspeaker production to China; the Massachusetts factory which had employed 100 assembly and woodshop workers was greatly reduced. EAW's plant retained the ability to fill some custom loudspeaker orders, they kept a number of management and clerical positions, and also the design team of Kenton Forsythe, David Gunness and Jeff Rocha. Gunness continued to research and prototype loudspeakers, and he checked Chinese production examples for quality of workmanship. In January 2007, EAW co-founder Kenneth Berger, a senior vice president of LOUD, left the company.

== Fulcrum Acoustic ==
Gunness left EAW in January 2008 to join with partners Stephen Siegel and Chris Alfiero in the establishment of Fulcrum Acoustic, a loudspeaker design and manufacturing company. Gunness became Vice President of R&D, and Lead Product Designer. The goal of Fulcrum Acoustic was to produce loudspeakers with "advanced DSP algorithms as integral to their designs" which had become Gunness's signature style. Gunness soon noticed that the time from initial concept to product launch was much faster at a small company. Most of the employees of Fulcrum Acoustic are former EAW coworkers.

=== Temporal Equalization ===
Gunness and Siegel turned their attention to coaxial loudspeakers, known for their desired single-point-source characteristics but also for various problems associated with intermodulation distortion—the low frequencies modulating the highs—and undesirable sonic variations in off-axis frequency response. Other negative aspects of traditional coaxial designs were their bulky weight and their lengthy axis requiring deep enclosures. Gunness and Siegel set about designing a coaxial with a common magnet for both low and high frequency drivers for weight savings and for reduced axial length, and a horn was developed to direct as much high frequency energy as possible away from the low frequency cone. A DSP solution called "Temporal Equalization" (TQ) was used to cancel out any remaining high frequency energy arriving at the moving cone. TQ was also used to cancel out high frequency horn reflections that returned to the compression driver. Gunness further developed his proprietary FChart software, renamed "Rayleigh" in honor of Lord Rayleigh, to enhance its capabilities for developing these and future products.

Gunness helped specify and design a 16-zone, 100-loudspeaker installation at the 25,500-square-foot (2,370 m^{2}) Haze nightclub at Aria Resort and Casino in Las Vegas, and he joined with Jamie Anderson of Rational Acoustics to discuss the loudspeaker performance targets and system tuning process via Smaart software, the talk given at a technical tour held in June 2010 during the Infocomm convention. Gunness said that system designer John Lyons asked for a subwoofer that would "crush" at all locations on the dance floor. Gunness responded by creating the US221 subwoofer with two 21-inch (530 mm) drivers. After hearing Haze's 130 dB SPL results, with a reported 10 dB of extra headroom because ten US221s were used, Lyons quipped that the system surpassed "crush" to establish "punish" as a benchmark. The same month, the 65,000-square-foot (6,000 m^{2}) Surrender nightclub at Encore Las Vegas opened with a Fulcrum Acoustic installation combining outdoor and indoor areas. Gunness aided in setting up and tuning the system. He noted that three US221 subwoofers supplied sufficiently high energy sound for the small dance floor. In December 2012, Wired magazine wrote about how temporal corrections developed by Gunness cleaned up "the smear of sound" present in normal nightclub loudspeakers.
