= Gauss (disambiguation) =

Carl Friedrich Gauss (1777–1855) was a German mathematician and physicist.

Gauss may also refer to:

== Science and technology ==
- Gauss (unit), a unit of magnetic flux density or magnetic induction
- Gauss (crater), a crater on the Moon
- GAUSS (software), a matrix programming language for mathematics

== Other uses ==
- Gauss (ship), a German research ship
- Gauss Speaker Company an American company that made loudspeakers
- Gauss (surname)

== See also ==
- Gauss rifle, a type of magnetic gun
- Gauss's law of electric fields
- List of things named after Carl Friedrich Gauss
- Georgy Gause (1910–1986), sometimes called Carl Friedrich Gauss
