= Peter Watts (sound engineer) =

British audio equipment designer

- Born: 2 February 1960 (age 66); London, England
- Occupation: Professional audio engineer

Peter Watts (born 2 February 1960) is a designer of pro audio equipment who is recognized as a leader in his field.

== Overview ==
Watts spent a total of 35 years designing analog and digital audio recording consoles. Watts has worked at several major audio manufacturers including Mackie Designs, in Woodinville, Wash., where he was the executive vice president of engineering from 1995 to 2002, and Trident Audio Developments in London, U.K. where he worked as head of Research and Development from 1976 to 1995. In 2003 Watts began his company, Peter Watts Designs, Ltd., in Hong Kong, China, which consulted to companies including Apogee Digital, Gibson Labs, Korg and Yorkville Sound. In 2009, he formed M&W Pro Audio Ltd., in Swansea, U.K., in partnership with Greg Mackie, founder of noted pro audio products companies TAPCO and Mackie Designs.

== Early career ==
At the age of 16, Watts began working at Trident on the mixer assembly line in their factory on the Shepperton Film Studios lot. In 1976, he showed company co-founder Malcolm Toft an idea he had for a computer-based mixer automation system, using a Sinclair Spectrum computer, which could change equalization settings automatically without using voltage-controlled amplifiers (VCA). Toft liked the idea, and it became the basis for the automation of the Trident Di-An (digitally controlled analogue) mixer. Watts worked on most of Trident's product line in various engineering roles, including as chief engineer on the VECTOR series large-format analog mixing console and the Di-An mixer.

== Mackie Designs ==
In 1995 Watts moved to Seattle, Washington, as vice president of engineering for Mackie Designs. Company chairman Greg Clark Mackie had just taken the company public and Watts was tasked with the job to build a team to design Mackie's first digital mixer, which resulted in the Mackie D8B Digital 8-Bus mixing console, He also oversaw development of other products including the HDR-24 Hard Disk recorder, which targeted the fast-growing affordable nonlinear recording segment, and Mackie Control (formerly Logic Control) computer-based mixing controls.

== New Ventures ==
In 2010, M&W Pro Audio Ltd. announced a co-development partnership with QSC Audio Products, LLC to develop, manufacture and market a new line of advanced, cost-effective digital mixing consoles.
