= Fulcrum Acoustic =

Manufacturer of professional loudspeakers

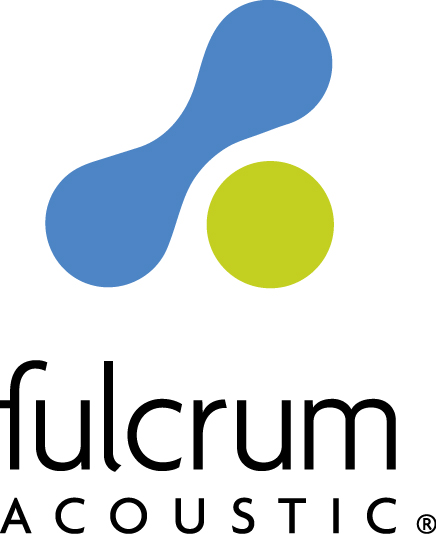
- Industry: Audio electronics
- Founded: 2008; 18 years ago
- Founders: Stephen Siegel, David Gunness, Chris Alfiero
- Products: Loudspeakers
- Website: www.fulcrum-acoustic.com

Fulcrum Acoustic is an American manufacturer of professional loudspeakers, including permanent-installation loudspeakers, portable loudspeakers, subwoofers, line arrays, stage monitors, and studio reference monitors. Their research and development offices and production facilities are located in Whitinsville, Massachusetts while their administrative offices are in Rochester, NY. Fulcrum Acoustic products are sold through an international distribution network and are deployed in houses of worship, sports venues, hospitality venues, concert halls, music festivals, theaters, and nightclubs.

== History ==
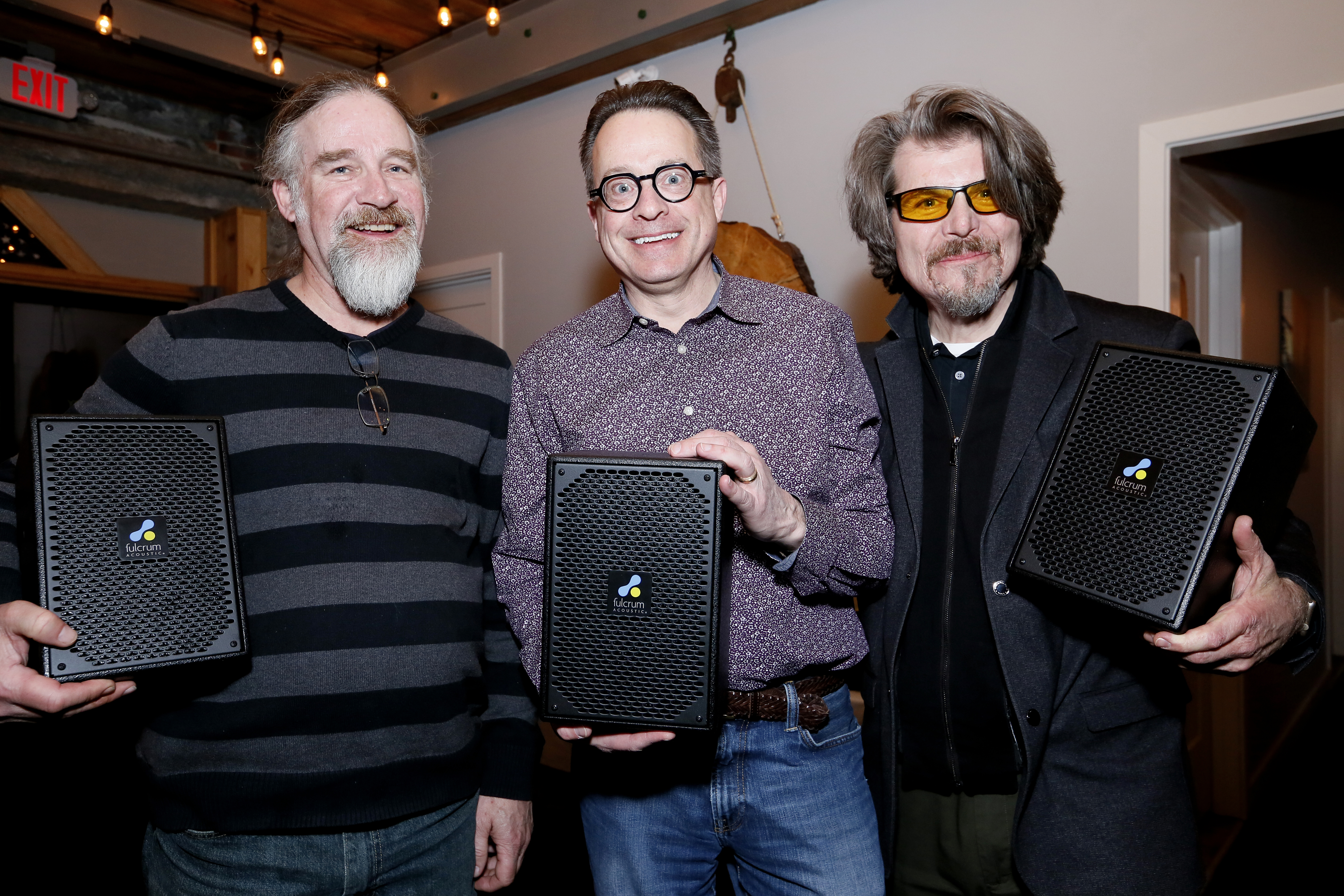
David Gunness, Stephen Siegel, and Chris Alfiero at Fulcrum Acoustic 10th Anniversary Party, 2018

Fulcrum Acoustic was founded in 2008 by Stephen Siegel, David Gunness, and Chris Alfiero. In 1993, Siegel was working as a sound system design consultant for Acentech when he first met Gunness and Alfiero, who were working for Electro-Voice at the time; Gunness in engineering, where he had achieved notability with his patented technologies and published technical papers; and, Alfiero in sales and distribution. Siegel and Gunness later worked together in the engineering department of Eastern Acoustic Works (EAW), while Alfiero shifted his focus to the world of finance. In 2007 Alfiero reconnected with Siegel and Gunness and ultimately supplied the seed capital to form Fulcrum Acoustic in 2008. The new company set about developing a product line and established a manufacturing operation in the United States in order to maintain control over the process.

The initial product line was centered around subwoofers and coaxial loudspeakers using a digital signal processing (DSP) technique dubbed Temporal Equalization. Gunness applied for a new patented technology when he developed Passive Cardioid Technology for Fulcrum Acoustic in 2016. Passive Cardioid Technology attenuates low frequency energy from the rear of the enclosure without the need for the additional amplifier channels and DSP used in active cardioid arrays. The company was officially awarded the patent for Passive Cardioid Technology in 2018.

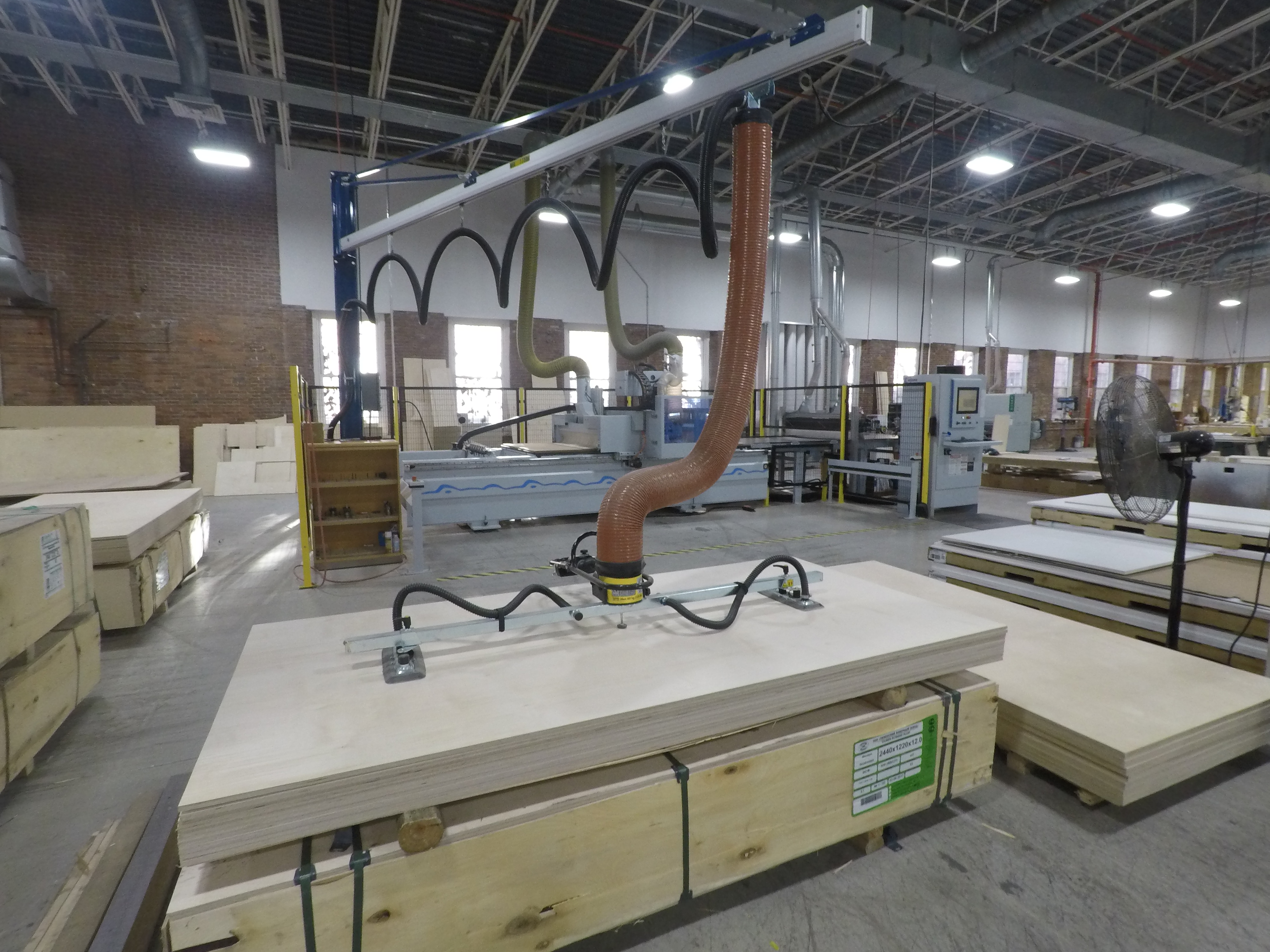
Homag Computer Numerical Control (CNC) Nesting Router at the Fulcrum Acoustic factory

In 2016 Fulcrum Acoustic expanded their production facility into a 35,000 square foot space in Whitinsville, Massachusetts. The new factory includes a full woodshop including a Computer Numerical Control (CNC) router for cutting both Baltic Birch parts and composite parts for weather-resistant enclosures. All enclosure assembly, secondary operations, painting, electrical assembly, testing, packing, and shipping takes place at the Massachusetts factory.
