= Ampeg SVT =

Bass guitar amplifier

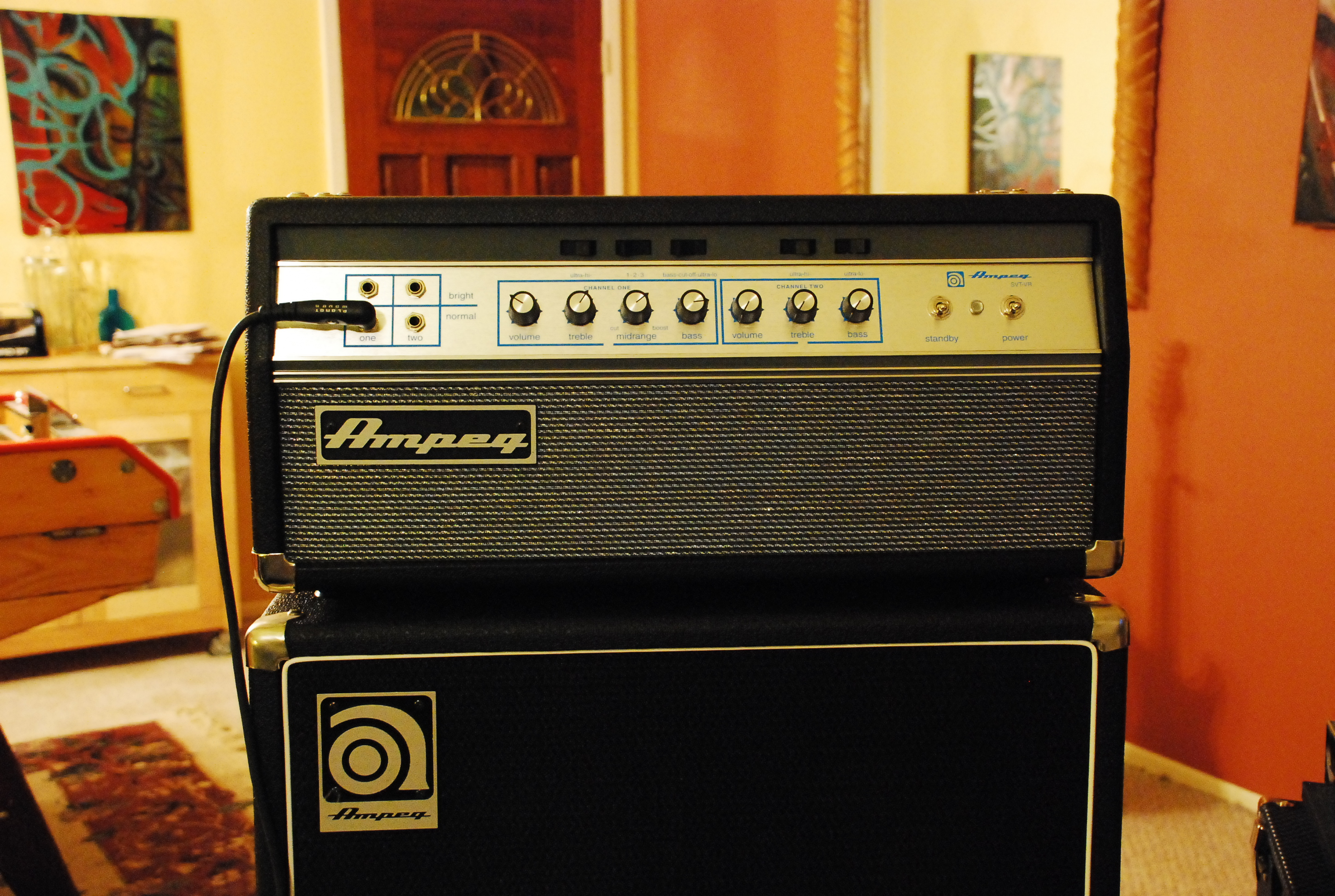
Ampeg SVT VR "Vintage Reissue"

The Ampeg SVT is a bass guitar amplifier designed by Bill Hughes and Roger Cox for Ampeg and introduced in 1969. The SVT is a stand-alone amplifier or "head" as opposed to a "combo" unit comprising amp and speaker(s) in one cabinet, and was capable of 300 watts output at a time when most amplifiers could not exceed 100 watts output, making the SVT an important amp for bands playing music festivals and other large venues.

The SVT has been through many design changes over the years but is still in production today. While the SVT could be used with any 300 watt, 2- or 4-ohm cabinet combination, Ampeg recommended that it be used with a pair of sealed 8x10" speaker enclosures because one cabinet could not handle the power of the SVT. It was not until 1980 that the speakers in the enclosures were updated to a power handling rating of 350 watts, allowing a player to use an SVT head with only one cabinet.

SVT originally stood for Super Vacuum Tube, but Ampeg has since revised the meaning of the initialism to Super Valve Technology, with the word "valve" referring to the vacuum tubes (called "valves" in Britain and some other regions) used in the amp.

== History ==
Following Unimusic's acquisition of Ampeg in 1967, the new company management was actively pursuing the rock market, opening offices in Chicago, Nashville, and Hollywood, and developing products designed to address the needs of rock musicians. When The Rolling Stones began rehearsing for their 1969 U.S. Tour in Hollywood, a power conversion failure blew up all of their UK Fender amplifiers. Their road manager, Ian Stewart contacted Rich Mandella at the Ampeg office in Hollywood, and Rich arranged for the band to use five prototype high-output amplifier heads of a new model being developed by Bill Hughes and Roger Cox. These new amps employed a 14-tube design to generate 300 watts of power in an era when most tube amps generated less than 100. The Rolling Stones took these prototype Ampeg amps on tour along with Rich Mandella, playing all guitars and basses through them for the entire tour. After the tour, Ampeg put the SVT into production, introducing it at the NAMM Show in 1969.

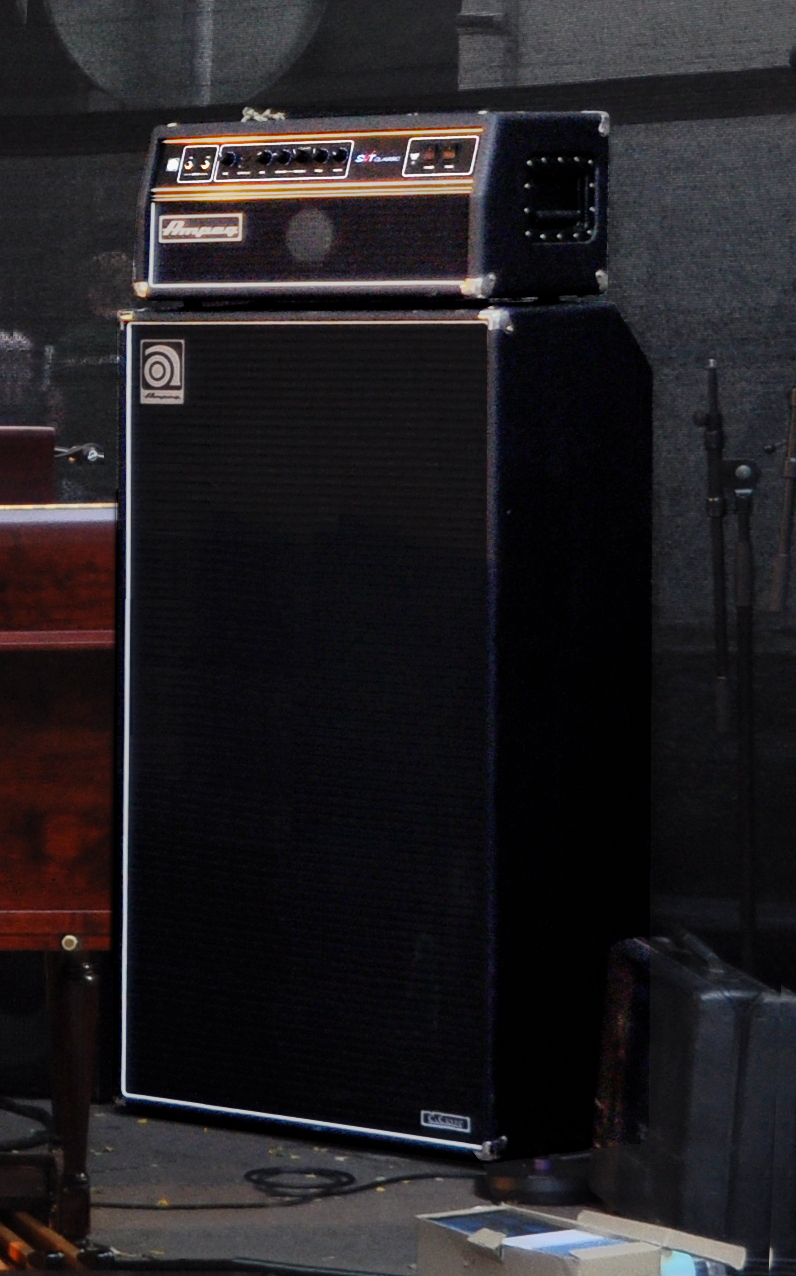
Ampeg SVT Classic
(black face & grill)

== Types ==
There are three types of original SVT amps. The first are the "blue line" SVTs, so named after the blue screen printing that surrounds the tone controls. Early 1969-70 "blue lines" used 6146B beam power vacuum tubes in the output stage, which proved unstable and was switched to the more robust, reliable and commonly used 6550 tube around mid-1970.

The second version of a vintage SVT is what is called the "black line" SVT, earning its name from the black (rather than blue) faceplate screen printing. Like the later-revision "blue lines" models, the "black line" SVTs utilize 6550 power vacuum tubes instead of 6146Bs. Later 1970s models have the same features as the "black line" SVTs, except the lines around the tone controls have rounded corners and curve into the tone controls. Additionally, these models included 3-prong power cables, and did not include a polarity switch.

In the early 1980s, Ampeg was bought by Music Technologies, Inc. (MTI), which contracted to have SVTs manufactured in Japan. While MTI-era SVTs are mostly identical to the previous versions, they did have differences. Cosmetically, MTI SVTs have black faceplates with white lettering, black grill cloth, "elephant hide" or rougher textured tolex, and rack case-style spring-loaded handles, updated from the previous (and painful) rubber-covered metal strap handles. These SVTs also include a back panel selector toggle for 2 or 4 ohm speaker impedance loads and a longer and thicker gauge 3-prong power cable. Additionally, some components, such as the transformers, on MTI-era SVTs are of Japanese origin as opposed to the original SVT transformers made by Chicago-based ETC.

In 1986, St. Louis Music acquired the rights to the Ampeg name and took possession of all remaining MTI inventory, which contained enough original components to build 500 amps. These 1987 Limited Edition SVTs were built in the U.S. by SLM's own Skunk Works crew, and each included an engraved panel indicating the unit's number within the production of 500 total units. In 1990, Ampeg introduced the SVT-II and SVT-II Pro, and in 1994, introduced the SVT-CL (Classic).

In 2005, LOUD Technologies (now LOUD Audio, LLC) acquired St. Louis Music, including Ampeg. Under LOUD's management, production of Ampeg and versions of SVTs and cabinets was moved to Asia. In 2010, Ampeg introduced the Heritage Series line, manufactured in LOUD Technologies' facility in Woodinville, Washington, including the Heritage SVT-CL head and SVT-810E and SVT-410HLF cabinets. The updated head featured JJ-branded preamp and driver tubes and "Winged C" 6550 power amp tubes, all tested and matched by Ruby Tubes in California, along with a thicker 1.6mm two-layer printed circuit board with through-hole plating and increased copper weight.

In May, 2018, Yamaha Guitar Group acquired Ampeg from LOUD Audio. Ampeg continues to manufacture and sell Heritage Series and SVT Pro Series models of SVT.
