= A Full Moon Consort =

American musical group in the 1970s

A Full Moon Consort was a St. Louis band in the 1970s, known for its live performances and contributions to the local music scene. Featuring members from earlier bands such as Jake Jones and King of Hearts, the group performed until 1978 and later reunited for a special performance in 1992. Members went on to successful careers in music and other fields, with some continuing to perform and teach in the St. Louis area. Notably, Chuck Sabatino's composition "Elijah" was covered by Head East, and the band was pioneering in integrating choreographed light shows into their concerts.

== Early years ==
A Full Moon Consort was a band from the St. Louis area in the 1970s, recognized as "one of the area's top bands" during the mid-1970s. The band performed from the mid-1970s until approximately 1978. Its members included Chuck Sabatino (vocals, flute, keyboards), Joe Marshall (guitar), Steve Strayhorn (drums), Joe Truttman (bass), and Dave Timmermann (keyboards, saxophone, and flute). The band was composed of members from three earlier groups: Jake Jones, King of Hearts, and The Rockets. Although Jake Jones was the name of one of the bands, none of the members were actually named Jake Jones.

== Later lineup and contributions ==
By the band's final iteration, Dave Ferris (piano/keyboards) and Jim "Peach" Thompson (bass/vocals) had joined. One of the band’s notable achievements was Chuck Sabatino's composition, "Elijah," which was covered by the Illinois band Head East on their self-titled album "Head East" (1978). Sabatino also contributed to a number of songs performed by Michael McDonald and other artists. Sabatino tragically suffered a stroke while performing with McDonald in Los Angeles in 1994 and died in 1996 in Belleville, Illinois.

== Notable performances ==
A Full Moon Consort was known for their pioneering live performances, particularly their shows at Michigan State University’s Abrams Planetarium in 1976. These concerts featured a choreographed light show in a darkened planetarium, a novel concept at the time. Encore performances followed in 1977 and 1978 at the same venue.

== Reunion and later years ==
In 1992, the band reunited for a performance at The Stadium Club in Belleville, Illinois, concluding the night with the song "Elijah."

After the band disbanded, the members pursued different paths. Joe Marshall remained in the St. Louis area until his death on February 26, 2014. He worked at St. Louis Music until the early 2000s, continued playing music through 2010, and taught at Forest Park Community College and B-Sharp music school in St. Louis, MO. Joe Truttman became a chiropractor and lives in the Belleville area. Steve Strayhorn, who played with the acclaimed blues band Uncle Albert, died in 2010. Marshall and Truttman would often join Strayhorn in the band Choozy Mothers until his death.

== Current status ==
Dave Ferris has lived in Los Angeles since 1979, working as a freelance jazz and studio musician. The whereabouts of Jim Thompson are currently unknown.
