= Forsythe Audio =

Company logo

Forsythe Audio Systems (commonly referred to as Forsythe Audio) was an American manufacturer of professional audio equipment specifically, loudspeakers systems offering extremely high reliability and high fidelity for sound reinforcement professionals. All their designs were by Kenton Forsythe. It was located in Watertown, Massachusetts.

The company was owned by Forsythe and Lewis Freedman, who previously started K&L Sound. The company initially operated out of Kenton's house and shop in Quincy then moved to a dedicated manufacturing and distribution building in Watertown.

== Milestones ==
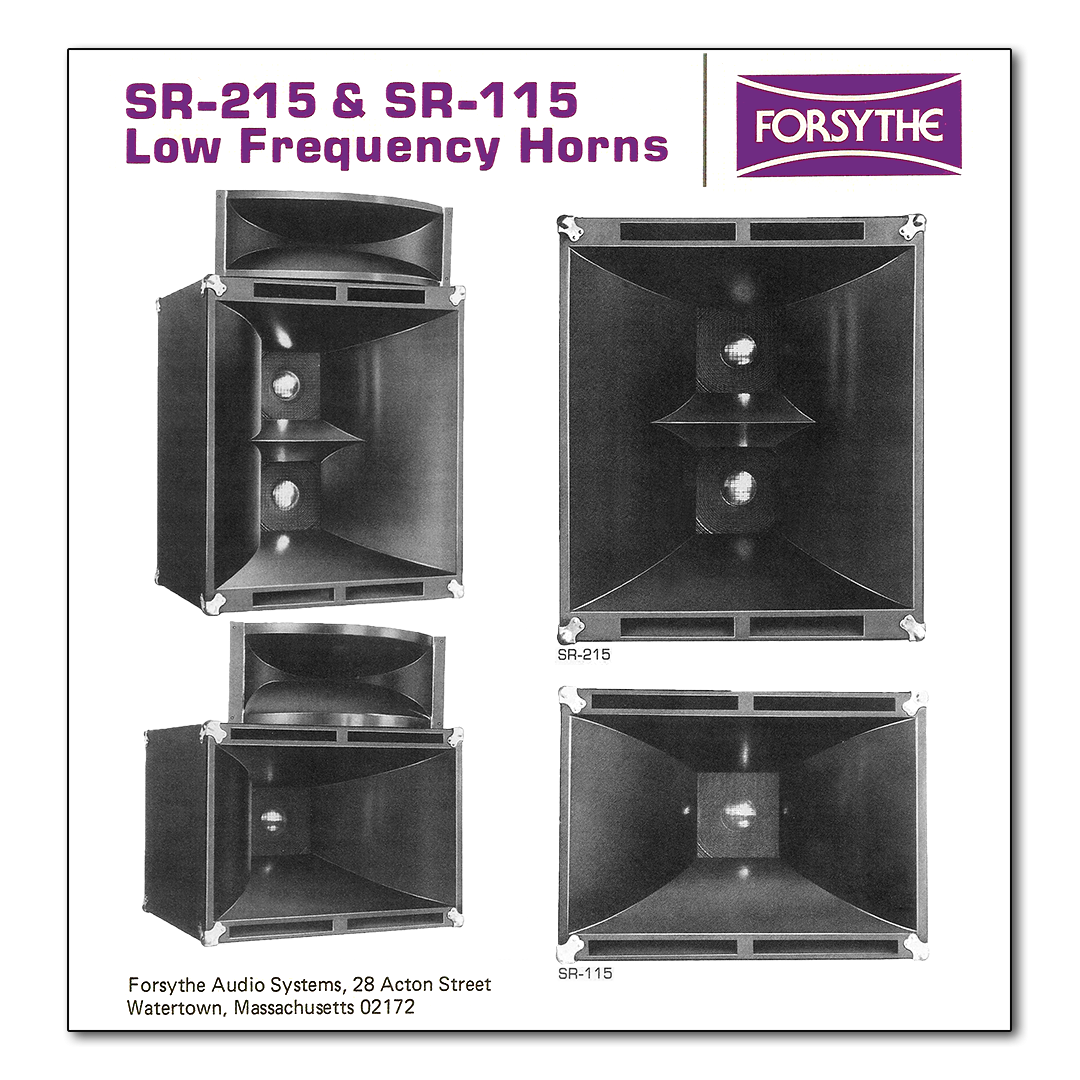
Forsythe Aduio SR215 and SR115 Bass Horns

1975: Forsythe Audio Systems was formed to sell the Kenton Forsythe's SR215 dual 15-inch bass horn design originally developed by Kenton at dB Engineering In Quincy, Massachusetts. The SR215 was the first bass horn in its class to be optimized to fit through a 30-inch door and is possibly the first to incorporate a phase plug between the 15-inch drivers.

1976: Forsythe moved to a dedicated facility in Watertown, Massachusetts, and added the SR115 single 15-inch bass horn to the line along with the addition of distribution through dealers outside the New England area, including Quantum Audio in New York City and Sound Genesis in San Francisco.

1977: Forsythe added two-way compact systems and vented subwoofer systems with a unique interchangeable tube venting system such the enclosure could be field reconfigured for use with various drivers from JBL Professional, Gauss Loudspeakers, Altec and EV.

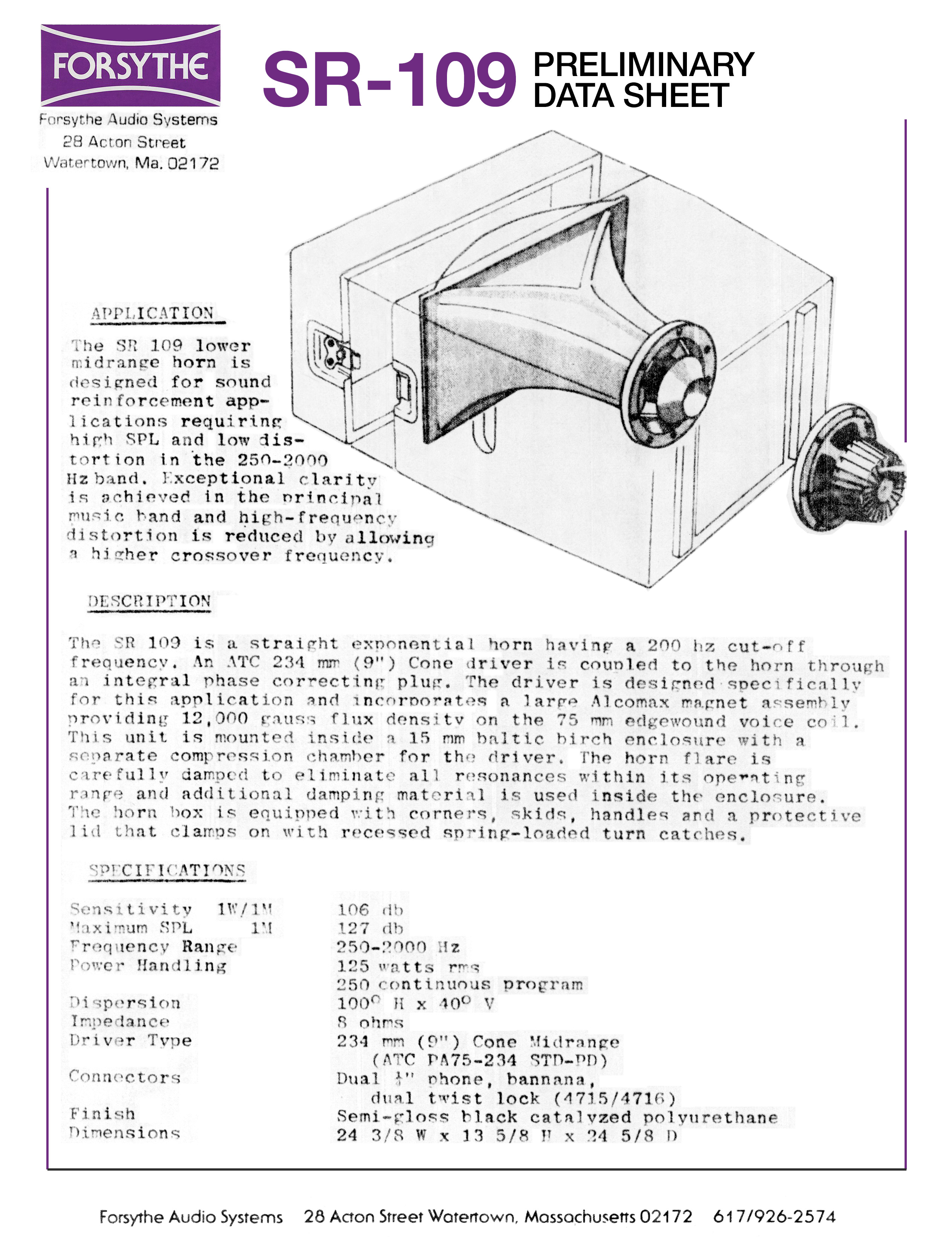
Forsythe / ATC SR109 lower mid-bass horn with 9-in transducer and integrated phase plug

1978: Forsythe became the US distributor for ATC loudspeakers from the UK. The SR-109 mid-bass horn was the first concert sound lower mid system to incorporate an cone driver with integrated phase plug.

== Key people at Forsythe Audio ==
Kenton Forsythe, founder and chief engineer; he later moved to Eastern Acoustic Works (EAW) after Forsythe was wound down in 1978.

Ken Berger, national sales manager, was responsible for setting Forsythe Audio Systems worldwide distribution – moved to from Eastern Acoustic Works in 1978, after leaving EAW in 2000 founded a new pro audio web portal "ProSoundWeb" http://www.prosoundweb.com.com

Gary Shea, worked building the Forsythe Product in addition to performing as a musician in leading Boston area bands including being a founding member of the band New England - left to pursue a full-time career in music. http://www.garyshea.net

Ben Wisch also worked at Forsythe Audio building systems and crossover assemblies while performing throughout the north east, and went on to become a very successful Grammy Award-winning player, producer and engineer. www.myspace.com/benwisch http://www.benwisch.com/

Lewis Freedman, was the co-founder of K&L Sound and co-founder along with Kenton of Forsythe Audio, he provided the funding and administrative controls to the company.
