= Alvarez Guitars =

American musical instrument maker

- Type: Private
- Industry: Musical instrument
- Founded: 1965; 61 years ago
- Founder: Kazuo Yairi
- Headquarters: St. Louis, Missouri, United States
- Products: Acoustic guitars (steel-string, classical); Ukuleles; Accessories
- Number of employees: over 750 world wide
- Parent: St. Louis Music
- Website: alvarezguitars.com

Alvarez is a guitar brand founded in 1965 by the owner and distributor St. Louis Music. It manufactures steel-strings, classical guitars, ukuleles; for a time, it did also solid and hollow-body electric guitars and basses.

== History ==
In the late 1960s, St. Louis Music's founder, Gene Kornblum, met Master Luthier Kazuo Yairi, who produced handmade concert classical guitars at a factory in Japan. Together, St. Louis Music and the Yairi factory started to design and develop steel-string acoustic guitars, building them in Japan and importing them into the United States. The guitars took the brand name of St. Louis Music's Spanish guitar line, “Alvarez.” Similar instruments were also sold under the factory brand of “K. Yairi” in Europe and other parts of the world.

From 2005 to 2009, the brand was owned by LOUD Technologies, which also owned Mackie, Ampeg, Crate and other music-related brands. In 2009, Mark Ragin (owner of US Band & Orchestra and St. Louis Music) brought the management and distribution of the guitars back to St. Louis Music. As early as 2011, SLM senior vice president Chris Meikle has acted as Alvarez's head of development, overseeing the redesign of Artist Series and other models and rolling out new instrument lines such as the 2014 Masterworks Series, the Alvarez 50th anniversary 1965 Series, Alvarez-Yairi Honduran Series and the Grateful Dead Series.

While many of its models are produced in China, the Alvarez-Yairi instruments are still handmade at the Yairi factory in Kani, Gifu-Japan, part of the legacy of the late Kazuo Yairi (1932–2014). Every Alvarez guitar then undergoes a full setup and inspection in their guitar shop in St. Louis, Missouri.

== Series ==
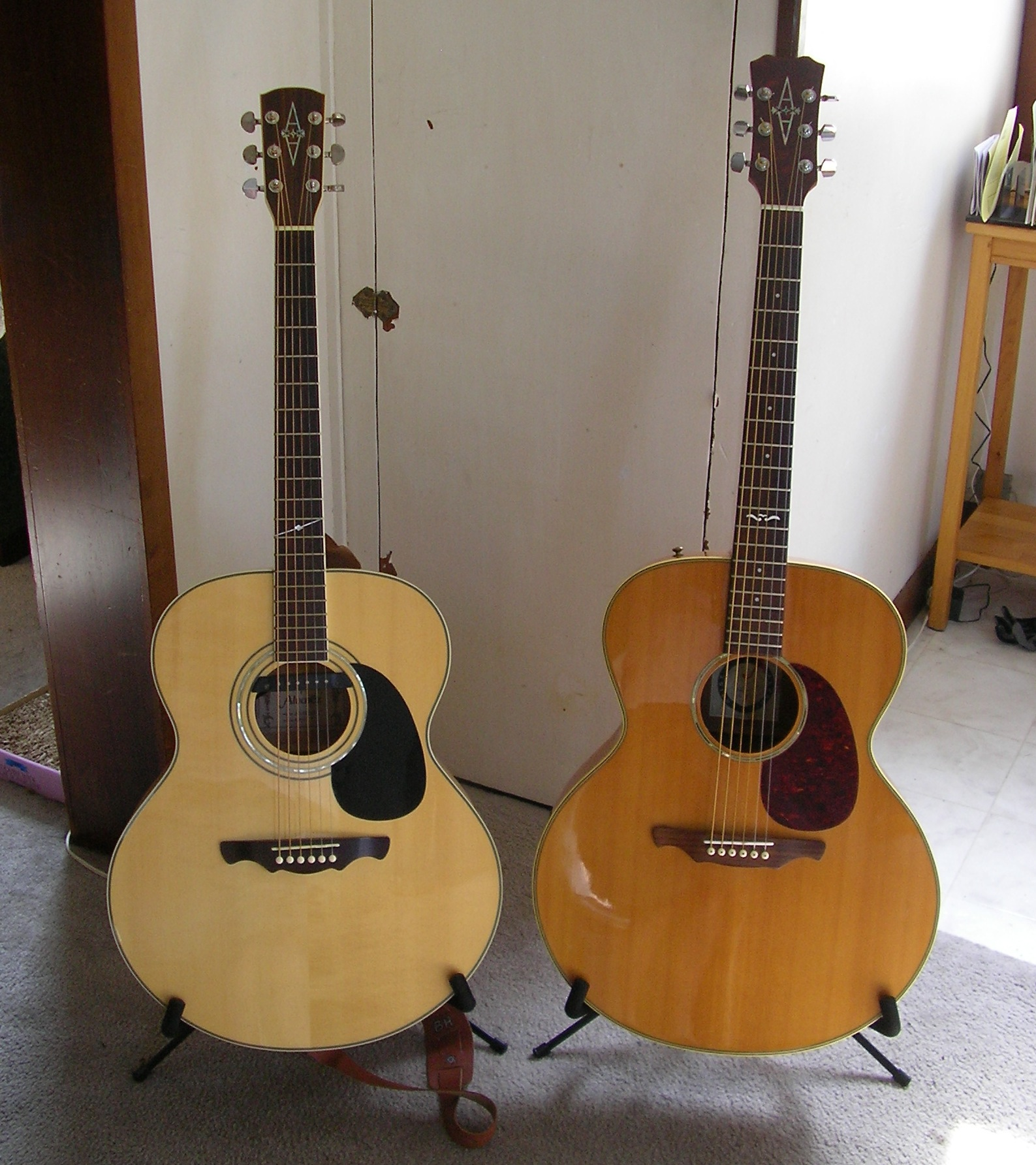
[right] Alvarez Artist Series Jumbo size guitar

Alvarez Guitars manufactures many models of guitar, categorized by price point and specialty into series.

=== Regent Series ===
The Regent Series are entry-level guitars for young or new players. The RD8 has been discontinued of manufacture, but, in 2018, Alvarez released the Regent School Series guitars specifically for students, their nut width slimmer than standard and their necks custom-shaped to be comfortable for small hands.

=== Artist Series ===
The Artist Series has won several awards, including a 5/5 rating in Acoustic Guitar Magazine and a nomination for best guitar series from The Music and Sound Retailer. In 2017, the Artist Series began adding new features and models, including armrests, the ATR (Advanced Tonal Response) system, and travel guitars like the Delta DeLite and LJ2.

=== Masterworks Series ===
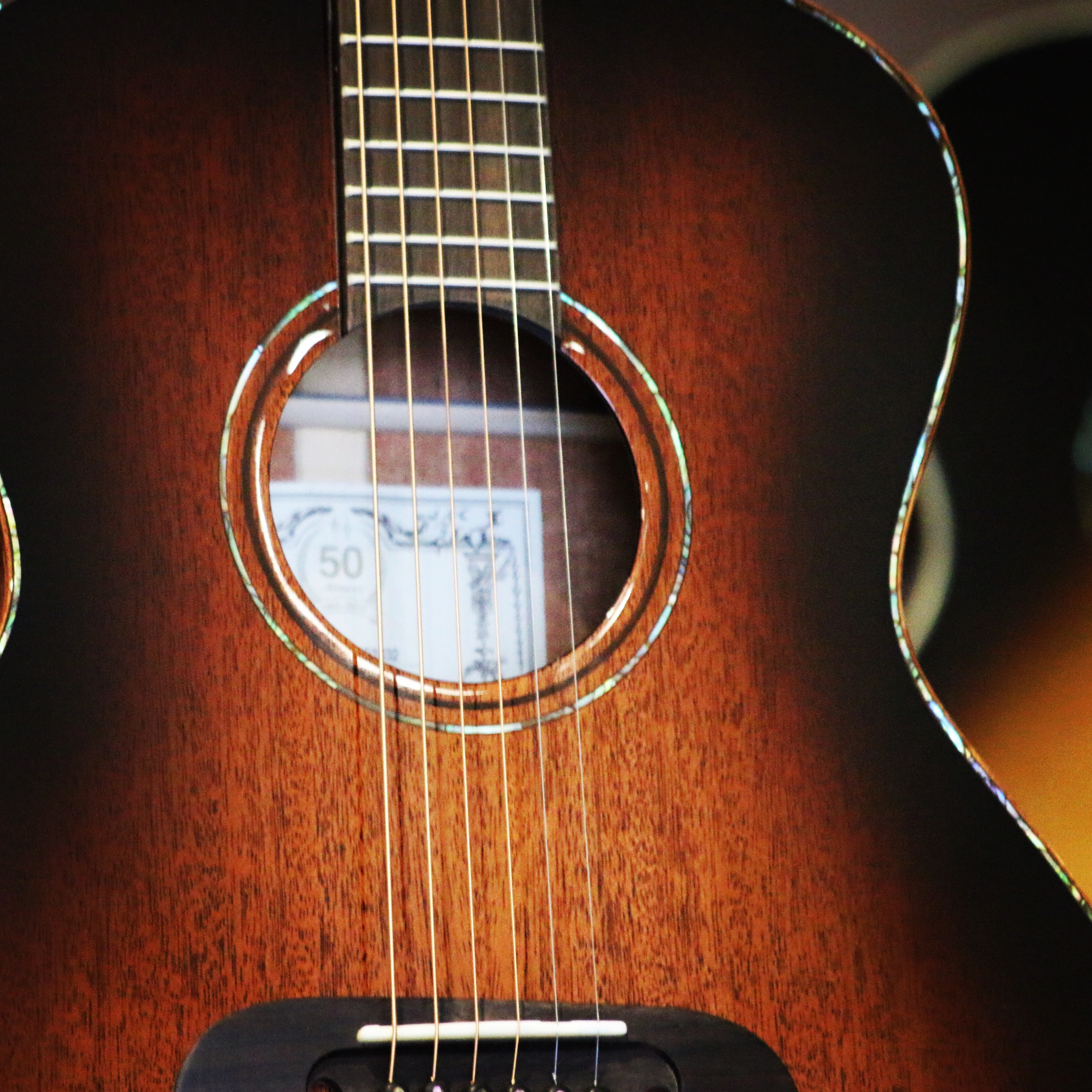
An Alvarez Masterworks Series Parlor Guitar with shadowburst finish and inlays

In 2014, Alvarez introduced the Masterworks Series, featuring all solid wood construction and appointments such as gold tuners, ebony bridge pins, mother-of-pearl inlays and maple or koa binding. In 2019, Alvarez introduced bluegrass-focused Masterworks models, the MF60OM and the MD60BG, that feature construction that emphasizes response when playing with a plectrum and flatpicking.

=== Alvarez-Yairi Series ===
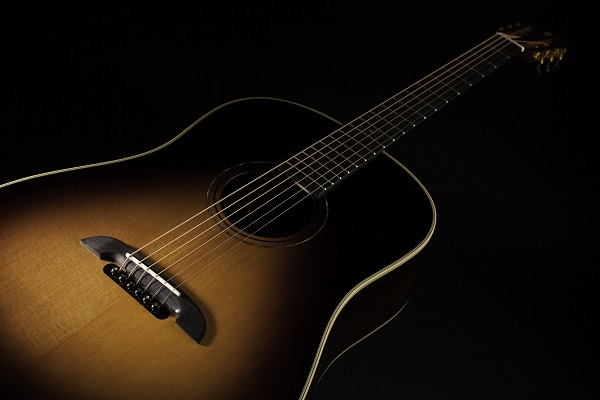
Alvarez Yairi Masterworks Dreadnought DYM70SB

Alvarez Yairi guitars are its flagship series, handmade in the Yairi factory. Players have included Jerry Garcia, Bob Weir, Ani DiFranco, and Joe Bonamassa. Many of their design aspects began with Kazuo Yairi, such as the Direct Coupled Bridge, careful selection of tonewoods, and manual carving, a practice he called "listening with your hands". Alvarez's 2017 discovery of a cache of Honduran mahogany tonewood purchased and stored by Kazuo Yairi in the mid-1970s, naturally seasoned for four decades, led to its making the Yairi Honduran line of guitars, which debuted in 2018.

== Alvarez players past and present ==
- Jerry Garcia
- Raulin Rodriguez
- Antony Santos
- Devin Townsend
- Bob Weir
- Carlos Santana
- Harry Chapin
- Glen Hansard
- Ani DiFranco
- David Crosby
- Graham Nash
- Jon Anderson
- Trevor Rabin
- Pete Yorn
- Jeff Young
- Joe Bonamassa
- Shaun Morgan
- Josh Turner
- Monte Montgomery
- Mike Inez
- Miguel Dakota
- Viktor Tsoi
- Mason Ramsey
- Thom Yorke
