= Gaus =

Gaus may refer to:

== People ==
- Bettina Gaus (1956–2021), German journalist
- Günter Gaus (1929–2004), German journalist
- Katharina Gaus (1972–2021), Australian immunologist
- Gaus Khan (1909–1980), Bangladeshi politician
- Gaus Shikomba (1935–2007), South West Africa Liberation Army intelligence officer

== Places ==
- Gaus Island, an island of the Philippines
- Gau (territory), an administrative division formerly used in Germany (pluralized as Gaue in German, but often as gaus in English)

== See also ==
- Gaus Electronics, a 2022 South Korean television series
- Gau (disambiguation)
- Gauss (disambiguation)
