= Music stand =

Stand to hold songbooks or sheet music

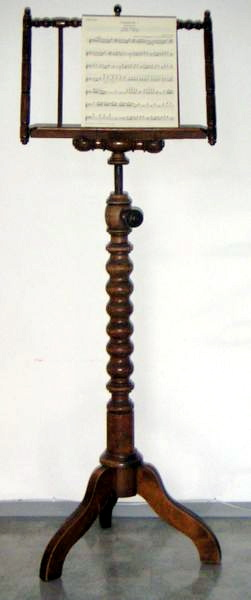
150px0A Light wooden music stand. This stand is designed for use in a private home or teaching studio. Its weight and fine finish make it unsuitable for daily transportation to rehearsals and gigs.

A music stand is a pedestal or elevated rack designed to hold sheets of music in position for reading. Most music stands for orchestral, chamber music or solo orchestra-family instruments (violin, oboe, trumpet, etc.) can be raised or lowered to accommodate seated or standing performers, or performers of different heights. Many types of keyboard instruments have a built-in or removable music rack or stand where sheet music can be placed. Music stands enable musicians to read sheet music or scores while playing an instrument or conducting, as the stand leaves the hands free. For choirs, singers typically hold their music in a folder, and singers performing solo recitals or opera performances typically memorize the lyrics and melodies. Some singers use stands, such as lounge singers and wedding vocalists who have a repertoire of hundreds of songs, which makes remembering all of the verses difficult.

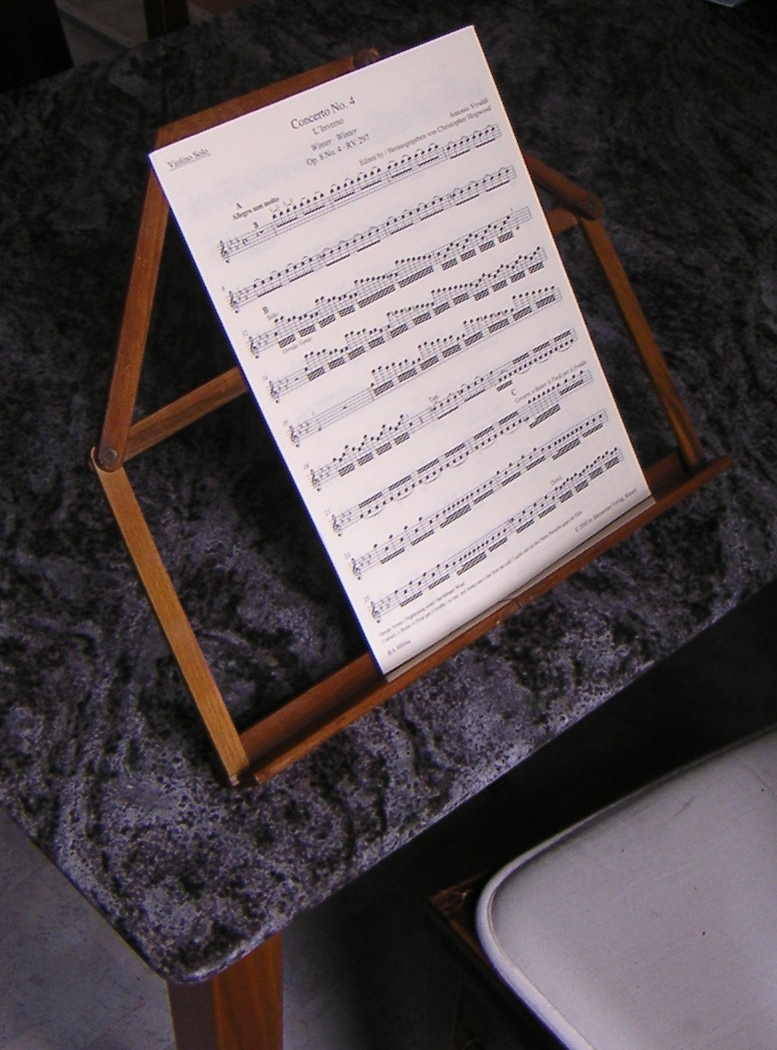
A table top stand.

There is evidence of music stands from China as early as 200 BC. They did not appear in Europe until much later, as most musicians played from memory or improvised. In the 16th century, playing music with a group in one's home became popular, and music was printed for amateurs' use. This music was typically laid down on a table or other flat surface in front of the instrumentalists.

Beginning in the 17th century, some amateur musicians used table-top music stands, which were the first kind of music stand in Europe. A few are still used today.

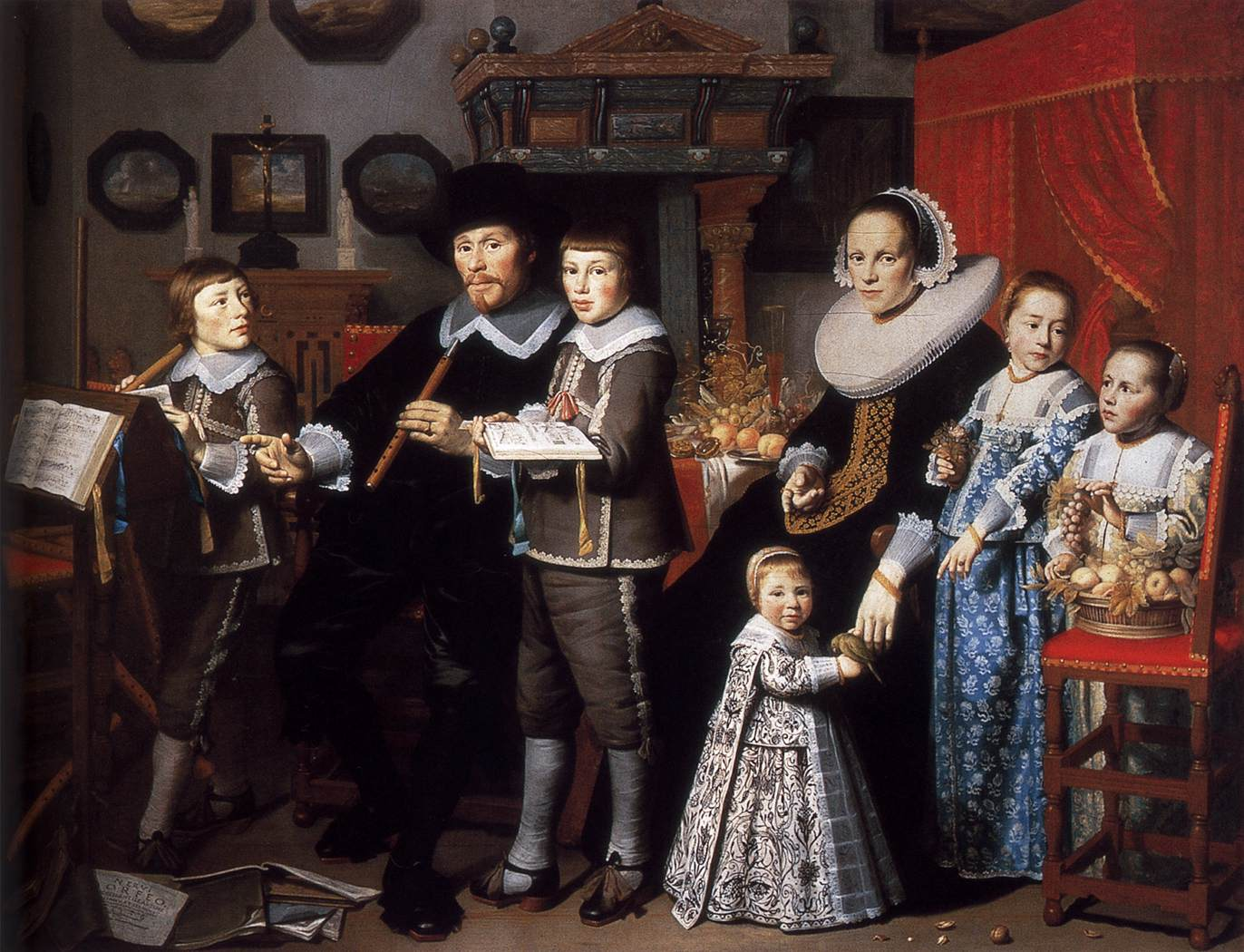
Floor-standing music stand, 1640, Portrait of Michiel van der Dussen Gemeente Musea Delft; Collection Stedelijk Museum Het Prinsenhof, Delft

It is not until the 17th century that floor-standing music stands were developed in the West. Such music stands were common by 1730, at least in France.

== Types ==
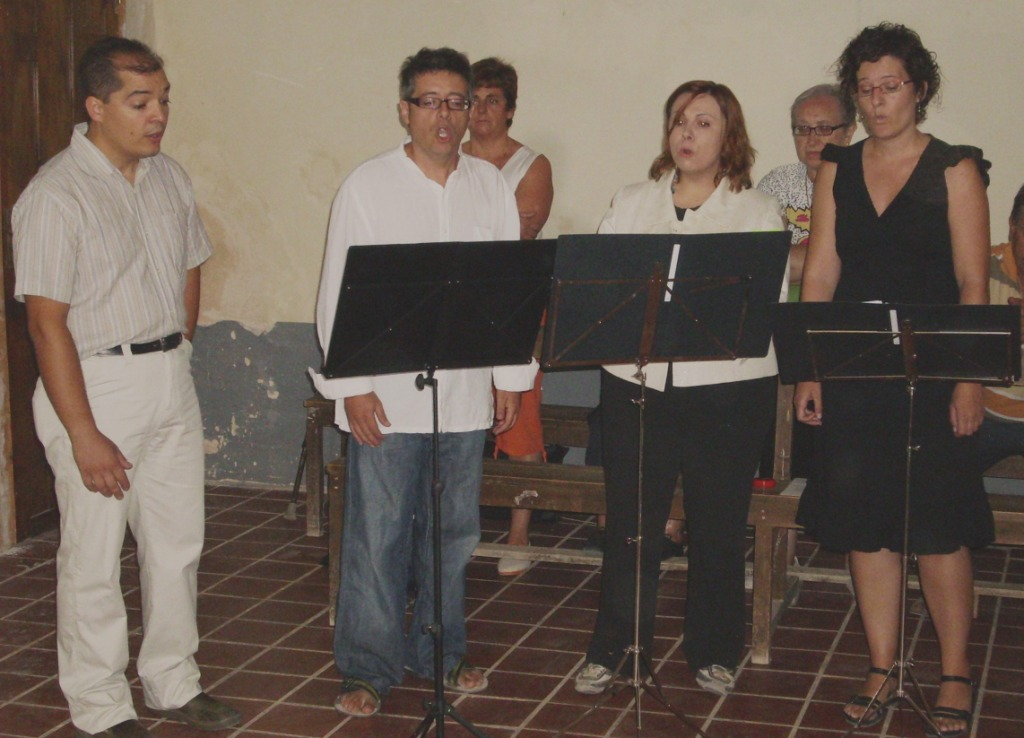
A vocal group using music stands.

There are a few types of music stand for different purposes and intended users. Folding stands collapse, which makes them easily portable. Folding stands are typically used by amateur musicians to practice and at rehearsals and performances. Professional musicians are more likely to limit their use of folding stands to rehearsals held outside of normal performance venues (e.g., a chamber music rehearsal at a private home) or small gigs. Non-folding stands tend to be used by professional orchestral musicians and big bands for rehearsals and concerts.

=== Folding stands ===
==== Lightweight ====
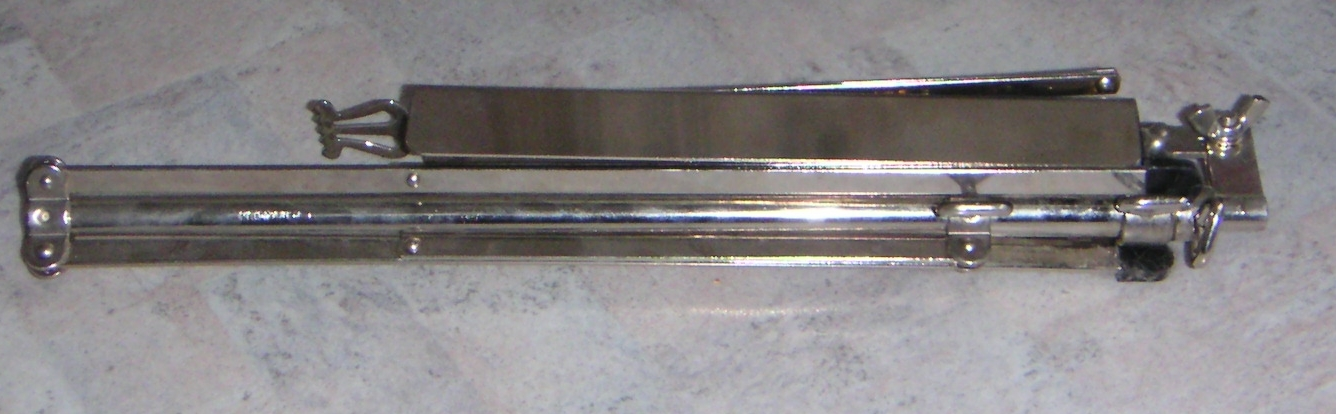
A folding music stand in its collapsed position, ready for transportation.

Folding stands range from inexpensive, lightweight models made of metal, which are designed to hold a few pages of sheet music or a thin songbook, to stronger, more expensive heavy-duty models. Metal folding stands often have solid wire extensions or metal "arms" which can be folded out to support more than two pages of music or over-size sheets or pages. This is the kind most often used by music students in youth orchestras. When folded, a folding music stand can often fit in an instrument case or backpack. They are a popular stand type for practicing, rehearsals, auditions and even some types of performances. Amateur orchestras and some youth orchestras may ask members to bring folding stands to rehearsals, and sometimes also to performances, as this saves the ensemble the cost of buying or renting, and transporting one or more racks of non-folding stands.

Lightweight stands are not designed to support heavy books of music such as full-size fake books; while the fake book may stay open on the stand, the music stand may fall over. Folding stands consist of a rack for the music and a telescoping cylindrical column for supporting the rack, with screws or other fastening devices to secure the extended columns at the desired height. Folding stands typically have a foldable tripod that supports the column and the music shelf. The rack area for holding the music is either pre-set at a slight incline away from the performer (as compared with being straight up), so that music will lie open naturally, or the degree of incline can be adjusted.

The portability of lightweight music stands can lead to some problems. Heavy fake books or full scores may overload the stand, leading to it falling over when a performer turns a page. Also, when a lightweight stand is used with its column fully extended, as by a standing orchestral timpanist or double bass player, a heavy part may be "tippy" on the over-extended column. Oversized parts, which are used in some contemporary classical music, may be too wide to be supported by the stand; a solution that some musicians use is to use multiple stands for oversize parts. During outdoor performances, such as playing at a wedding, picnic or a bandstand, lightweight stands may be blown over by wind, which can interrupt a performance or even, if the stand strikes an instrument, damage the finish of an instrument.

According to various online retailers, Hamilton Stands invented the modern folding music stand in 1883.

==== Heavy duty ====
Heavy duty folding models typically use a hollow cylindrical column as the main support and three cylindrical columns arrayed in a tripod to ensure the stand stays upright. Heavy duty stands can reliably support a thick, several hundred page fake book, song book or a binder full of songs. The height of the column can be raised or lowered to permit the stand to be used for a seated performer (common for most orchestral instruments, except for percussion and sometimes double bass) or a standing performer.

=== Professional ===
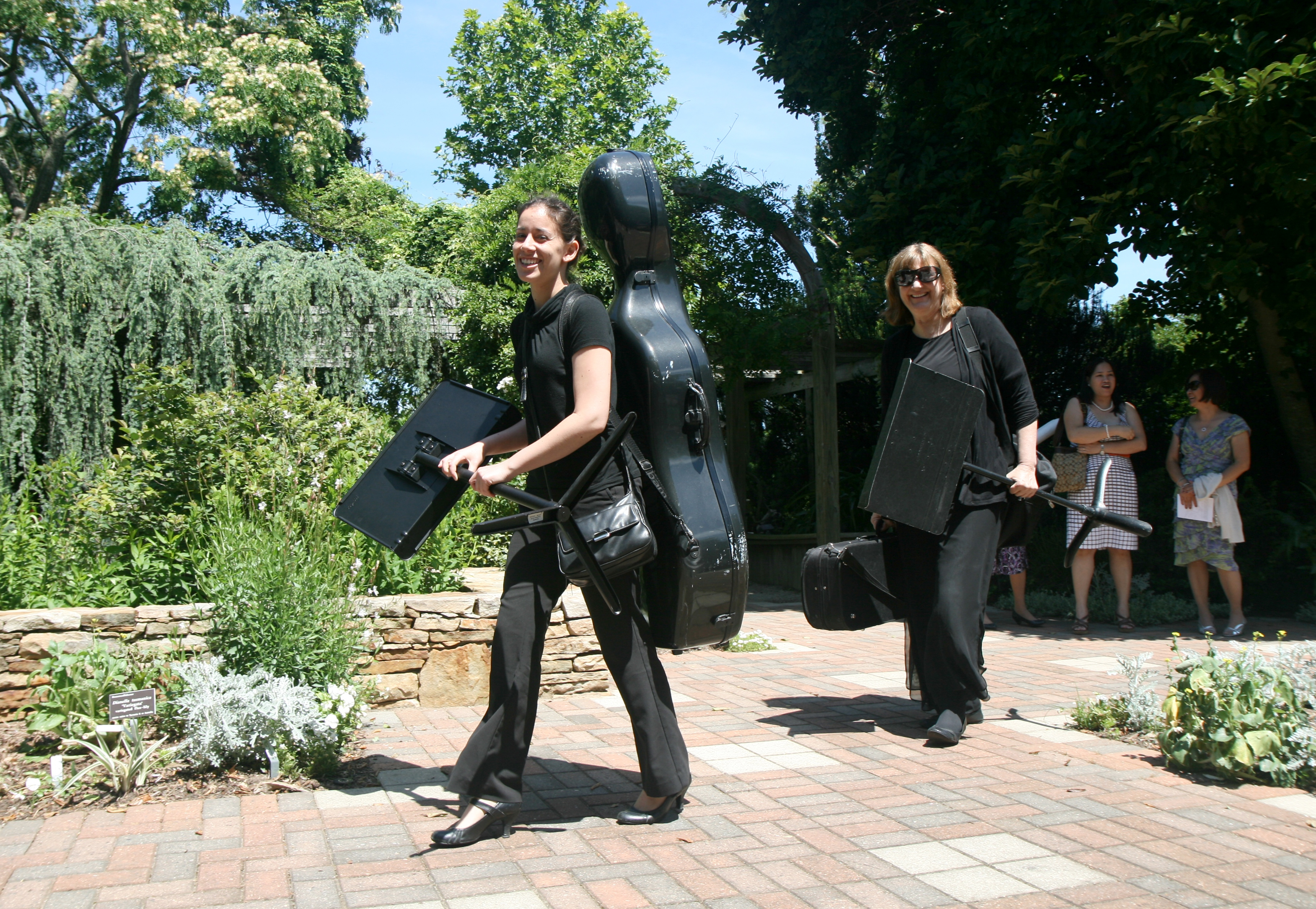
Musicians leaving a wedding performance carry professional music stands.

Professional orchestras, concert bands and big bands typically use heavy-duty stands that do not fold. The stands are typically colored or painted matte black so that they are not distracting. The shelf sometimes has an accessory ledge at the bottom for pencils, rosin (for string players), and other accessories. They have some type of tripod-style or quadruped-style base, or they have a heavy metal base, often circular. The metal column can be raised or lowered to put the shelf at the desired height. Some shelves have perforations to reduce the weight of the stand.

Some musicians use professional stands for all of their rehearsals and gigs, even though this may mean making more trips to load their gear into the hall. They are more stable than folding stands, they are less likely to fall over outdoors, and they look more professional.

=== Conducting stands ===
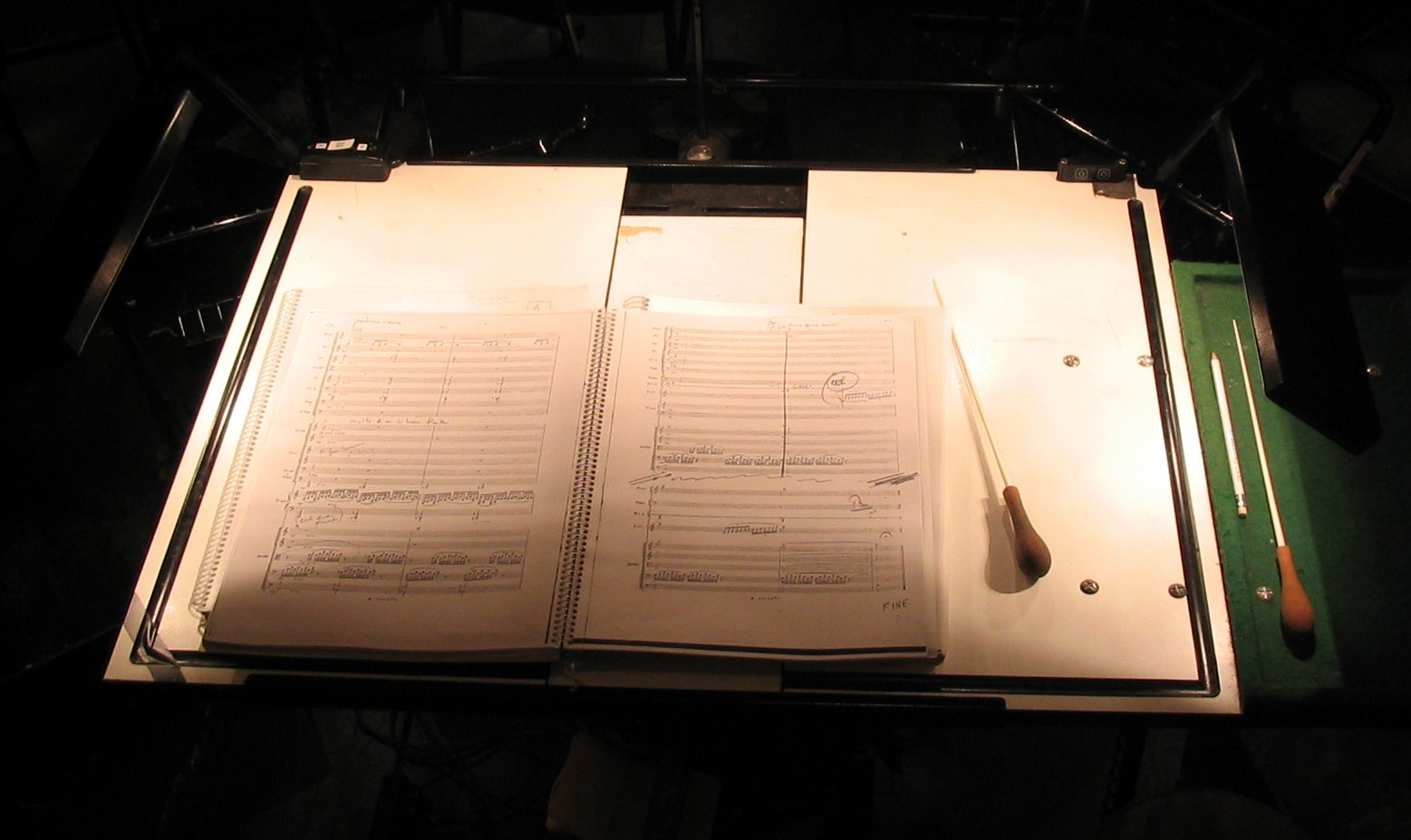
A large, heavy conductor's stand.

Very large, heavy-duty stands are available for conductors of orchestras, concert bands, choirs and big bands to hold their heavy, over-sized scores of music. These stands are typically not designed to be easily transportable, and they are usually intended for installation in a rehearsal hall or concert hall. A conductor's stand has to be able to be angled much flatter than an instrumentalist's stand, because the conductor reads from a large full-score, which contains the parts for all of the instruments. For some symphonies, the score can be both thick and heavy; to ensure that the stand is stable, a conducting stand needs to have a heavy, wide base and a sturdy platform for the score, called a desk. As with professional stands, some conducting stands have a narrow ledge at the bottom and some also have a storage pocket on the back where conductors can store their batons, handkerchiefs, reading glasses, and other accessories.

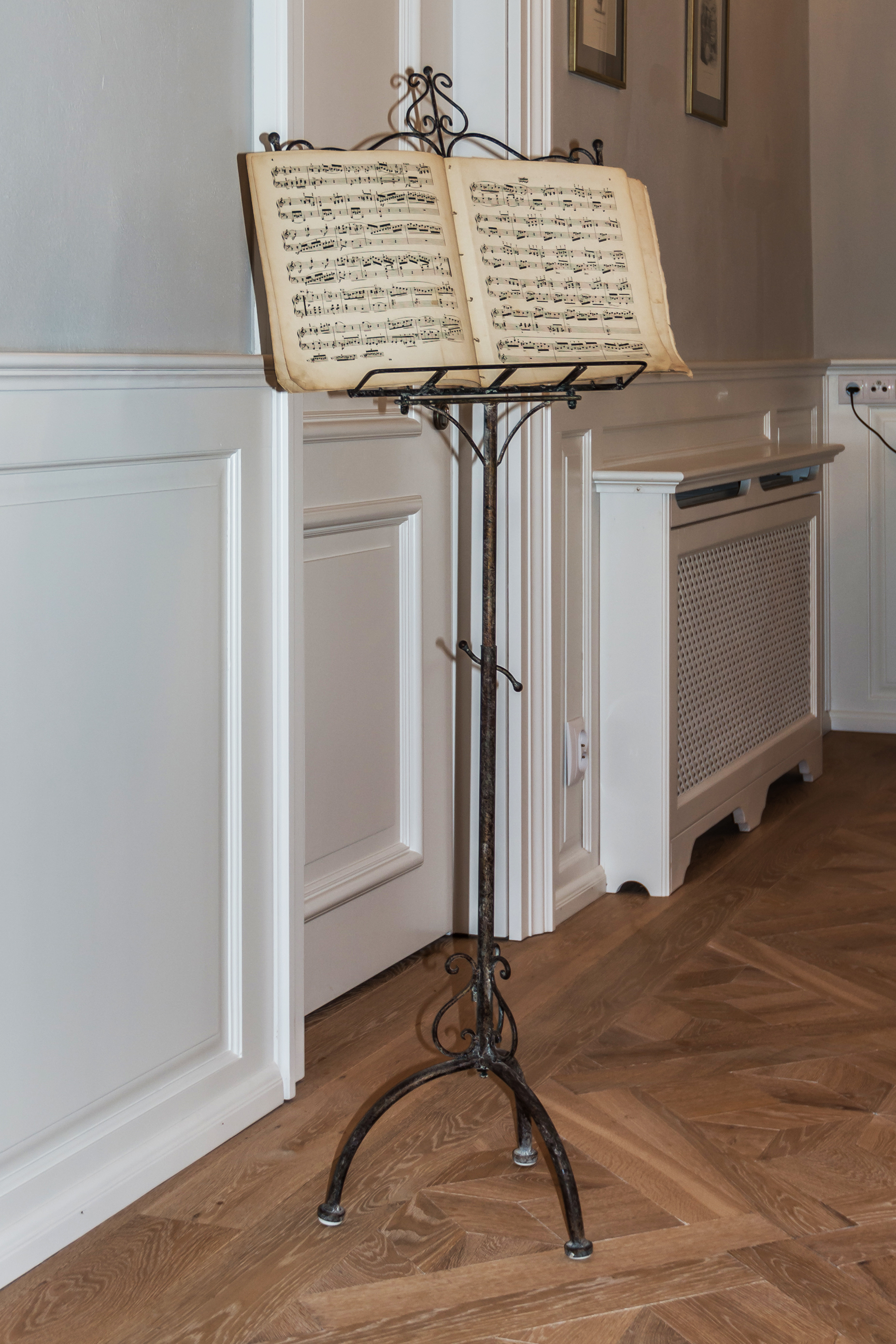
An expensive antique music stand.

=== Non-portable ===
Musicians may have stands in their homes or music studios made of wood or metal which are not designed to be moved. Due to their weight and/or their delicate finishes, they are intended to be used in a single location. Some heavy stands are made of carved wood and feature bas relief carvings and inlay work. Other heavy stands are made of brass, and feature musical motifs such as treble clefs. Some of these stands are objects of art in their own right.

=== Digital ===
Digital music stands that use a computer screen to display the music began being used in the 1990s and 2000s. The digital "pages" can be turned by pressing an electronic footpedal, thus enabling performers to play chamber music or solo pieces with difficult page turns without hiring or finding a volunteer to act as a page turner. The music notation is typically displayed on a flatscreen display or a tablet computer screen.

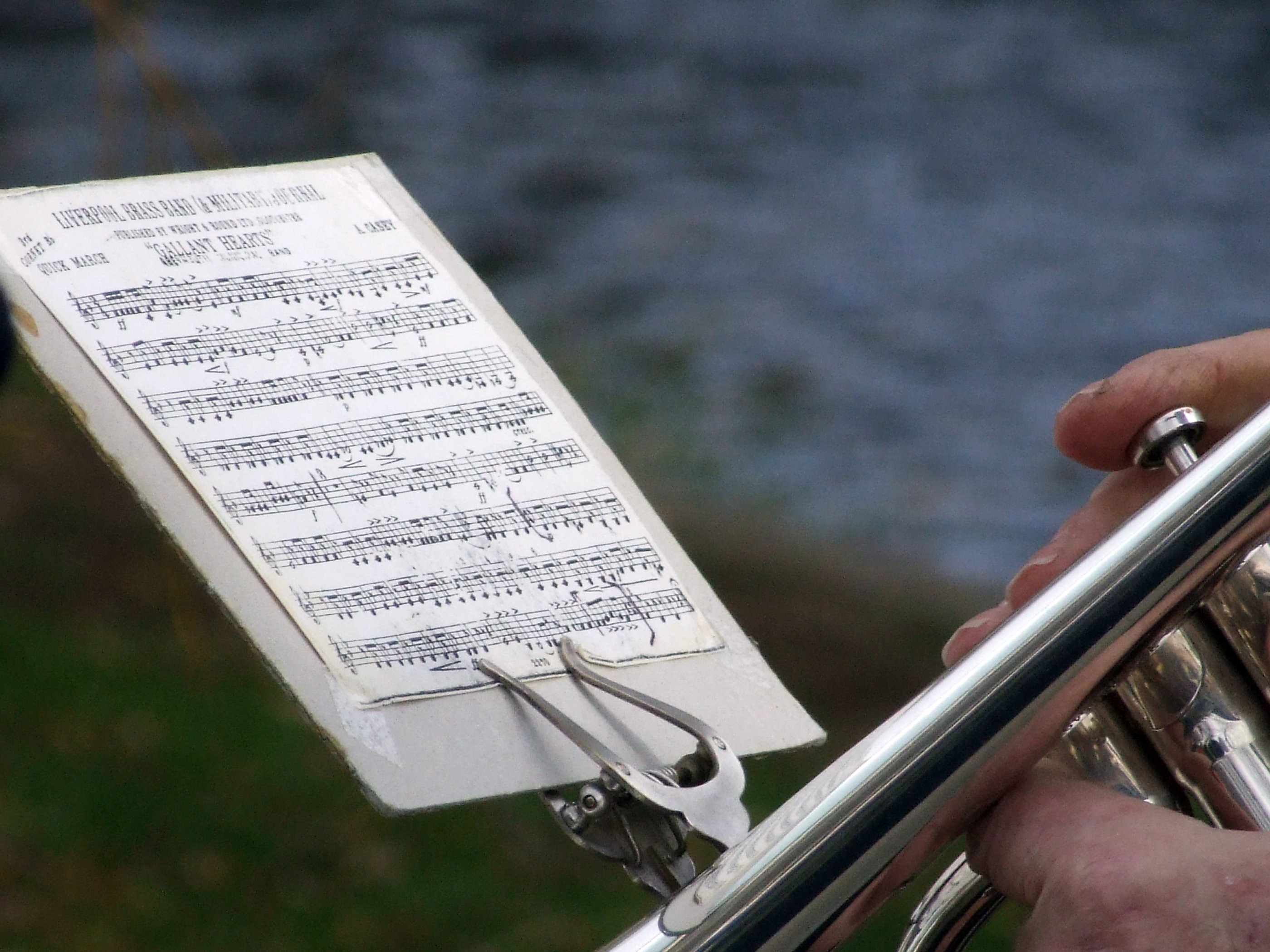
A marching band "clip" for a trumpet player.

=== Marching band ===
Marching band or some brass band members use a small sheet holder called a lyre or a clip which can be attached to an instrument. The clip holds a small piece of music, so the musician can read it while marching.

=== Keyboard instruments ===
Pianos, harpsichords, organs, and many post-1980s electronic keyboards have some type of rack or stand to hold sheet music and scores. On some grand pianos, the music stand can be removed when a performer is playing from memory. On some electronic or electric keyboards, the stand can be removed to facilitate transportation and avoid damage. On some digital pianos designed for use in a private home or studio, the music rack is permanently installed, though it may fold down. Most keyboardists who regularly transport electronic keyboards use stage pianos, or MIDI controller keyboards along with a sound module; on these instruments, all of the accessories (music rack, keyboard stand, sustain pedal) can be disconnected.

== Lighting ==
In opera, ballet and musical theater, the orchestra (or band in the case of musicals) often plays in an orchestra pit in front of and at a lower level than the main performance stage. For dramatic reasons, the stage may be darkened at times during the performance, and the house lights turned off. In order to see, small stand lights are clipped onto the tops of the stands and to avoid having the stand lights distract audience members, some have cloth "hoods" over the lights. Originally, stand lights were incandescent and mains supplied but in the 2000s, as LED lights became more affordable, battery powered LED lights became widely used. A Canadian viola player invented a stand with a built-in LED light, for dark performing settings.

== Comparison with music desk ==
The term stand, as it is used to describe furniture such as a plant stand or music stand, generally implies a relatively small surface area supported at the required height, most usually by a turned leg or support known as a standard. Any inclined surface that can be used for supporting music may be thought of as a music stand, although generally this function is divided between two types of furniture: a music stand proper and a music desk. The music stand consists of a support for the music raised upon a freestanding column or tripod, which, in addition to being movable, may also be adjustable with regard to its height and the angle at which it may be tilted. A music desk forms part of a table.
