= Hamilton Stands =

Hamilton Stands Inc. is a musical instrument accessories manufacturing company founded in 1883 in Hamilton, Ohio and based in Middletown, Ohio. The company is currently owned by St. Louis Music.

Hamilton is most famous for their wide variety of music stands (from light, fold-up types to rugged, near-permanent ones), used by musicians and music students around the world. Other Hamilton accessories include capos for stringed instruments, and instrument stands.

Musician Bob Dylan frequently used a Hamilton capo on his guitars, and studio and concert photos reveal their distinct look. Michael Nesmith of the Monkees referenced a Hamilton stand in his song "Circle Sky", in the line "Hamilton's smiling down".
