= Gauss (surname) =

Gauss or Gauß or Gausz is a surname. Notable people with the surname include:

- Carl Friedrich Gauss (1777–1855), German universal mathematician and physicist
- Friedrich Gustav Gauss (1829–1915), German geologist, who also published some well-known logarithm tables (and thereby sometimes gets confused with Carl Friedrich Gauss, who introduced Gaussian logarithms earlier on)
- Christian Gauss (1878-1951), American literary critic
- Ernst Gauss, one of several pseudonyms of Germar Rudolf (b. 1964), German Holocaust denier and chemist
- Karl Johann Gauss (1875–1957), a Notable German Obstetrician and Professor
- Clarence E. Gauss (1887–1960), US Ambassador to China and Australia

"Gauss" is also (rarely) used as a given name, e.g.:

- Gauss Moutinho Cordeiro, Brazilian engineer

== See also ==
- Gaus (disambiguation)
