= Antigua Winds =

Antigua Winds is a manufacturer of woodwind and brass instruments, including saxophones, clarinets, trumpets, flutes, and musical instrument accessories. It was founded in 1991 by musician and educator Fred Hoey in San Antonio, Texas. Antigua Winds specializes in both professional and student instruments.

In 2018, St. Louis Music secured exclusive North American distribution rights for Antigua Winds.

In 2022, KMC Music was named as the exclusive United States distributor for Antigua Winds Brass and Boodwind instruments. However, there no longer seems to be an exclusive distributor in the USA.

== Saxophones ==
Antigua Winds first began as a saxophone manufacturer. Antigua saxophones include the student Antigua VOSI series, intermediate Antigua series, and professional Antigua Pro - Power Bell Series. Antigua cooperated with Peter Ponzol in 2011 for the Pro-One Saxophones.

== Clarinets ==
The Antigua-Backun clarinet is the latest addition to the range of instruments offered by Antigua Winds and Backun Musical Services. It was on the list “The Top 50 Band Standouts” on Music Inc. Magazine in March 2012.
