= Greg Clark Mackie =

American entrepreneur

Greg Mackie
- Born: September 22, 1949 (age 76); Seattle, Washington
- Occupation: Audio Mixer Console Designer
- Known for: Audio Engineering / TAPCO, Mackie Designs, M&W

Greg Mackie is an American entrepreneur and inventor of professional audio products, best known as the founder of Mackie Designs. Together, Mackie and Peter Watts are the team behind M&W Pro Audio Ltd..

== Biography ==
Gregory Clark Mackie was born on September 22, 1949, in Mukilteo, Washington, to parents Clair and Nathalia Mackie. His father Clair served as a ham radio operator in World War II and remained active in ham radio clubs the rest of his life, exposing his son Greg to scores of electronic catalogs and parts at an early age. In the mid-1960s, Mackie volunteered for and served in the U.S. Army. After being discharged, he worked at Boeing and pursued this lifelong interest in electronics. While playing in a band as a drummer, Mackie inspected an amp they had rented, comparing its parts to those in an electronics catalog. Mackie felt confident that he could create a better-performing product at a lower cost. In 1970, Mackie and Martin Schneider co-founded a company that made guitar amps, speakers, and other music gear, but it was an audio mixer, which would become the TAPCO 6000 that launched his successful career as a pro audio entrepreneur.

== Career ==
=== TAPCO ===
Mackie and his lifelong friend Martin Schneider co-founded TAPCO in 1970. He and associates Martin Schneider and Rodger Rosenbaum devised the company's seminal Model 6000 audio mixer, the first designed specifically for the louder volumes required by rock bands. Its innovations included variable-gain mic preamps. TAPCO also helped Mackie develop his understanding that form was as important as function for the new generation of pro audio equipment, that the external look and feel of a product is very important to the consumer. "Consumers have a tough time getting past a poor quality exterior even if the internal quality is excellent," he told an interviewer.

TAPCO would grow into a multimillion-dollar success. Mackie left in 1976 to start AudioControl, establishing it as a leading producer of stereo equalizers and analyzers for consumer stereo systems. TAPCO was eventually sold to Electro-Voice. However, in 2003, Mackie purchased the rights to the TAPCO name from Electrovoice and applied it to a line of budget mixers, speakers, amplifiers, and other audio equipment, under the LOUD Technologies umbrella of brands.

=== Mackie Designs ===
Mackie Designs was formed in 1988 to address what Greg Mackie perceived as a burgeoning but untapped market for mid-priced but powerful small audio mixers and consoles that lay between the expensive upper end of the market that served professional recording studios and the mass-produced low end of the market. Working initially from his three-bedroom condominium in Edmonds, Washington, and using parts left over from his previous ventures, Mackie created the LM-1602, which became popular with musicians, churches, small recording studios and schools. That was followed by the CR-1604 mixer in 1991, which was even more successful and continued to hew to Mackie's philosophy of simple, rugged design and affordable pricing. In 1993, Mackie Designs debuted its 8-Bus mixer consoles, which were designed specifically for multi-track recording and live sound applications. These mixing products produced spectacular growth rates—revenues for 1994 topped $35.5 million, and the company had over 250 employees. Mackie Designs was taken public in 1995, largely to capitalize further R&D and manufacturing capacity. That same year it sold its 100,000th mixer product and moved into a new 89,000-square-foot (8,300 m^{2}) manufacturing facility in Woodinville, Washington, that was equipped with state-of-the-art automated production machinery, which helped boost the company's manufacturing productivity. Here, Mackie developed and produced the SR 32–4, a 32 channel mixer designed specifically for live sound applications, and the UltraMix Universal Automation System, which let users automate, store, and replicate over 136 channels of parameters for a retail price of $2,795, well below the cost of competing console automation systems. Additional innovative products followed, as did entirely new lines of products, such as the Mackie 8200 Accuracy Active Studio Reference Monitor and the M-1200 premium power amplifier, its first-ever non-mixer product. The company also grew by acquisition, purchasing complementary brands including EAW, RCF, RCF Precision, SIA Software and Acuma Labs. Mackie Designs would grow to sales of $153.8 million and 946 employees by 1999.

=== Leaving Mackie Designs ===
Greg Mackie announced his plans to sell his controlling stake in Mackie Designs in January 2003, also stepping down as chairman that year in the wake of slowing sales and increased debt due in part to the technology bubble-induced economic recession in the first years of the decade. In 2001, the company lost $5.3 million on sales of $206.5 million. Investment firm Sun Capital Partners Inc. of Boca Raton, Fla., acquired 65 percent of Mackie Designs' stock, though Greg Mackie retained a three-percent share of the stock and continued as a consultant until mid-2006. The same year, the company's name was changed to LOUD Technologies Inc.

=== M&W Pro Audio ===
In 2010, six years after retiring from Mackie Designs, Greg Mackie and mixing console technology designer Peter Watts formed M&W Pro Audio. That same year, QSC Audio Products, LLC announced a co-development partnership with M&W Pro Audio to develop, manufacture and market a new line of advanced digital mixing consoles.

In 2020, Korg partnered with M&W and released the SoundLink series of mixing consoles.

== Awards and recognition ==
- 2016 - Parnelli Audio Innovator Award
- 1996 - Ernst & Young Entrepreneur of the Year Award - High Technology
