= Kenton Forsythe =

American loudspeaker designer (1944–2023)

- Born: July 21, 1944; Boston, Massachusetts, U.S.
- Died: July 9, 2023 (aged 78); Smithfield, Rhode Island, U.S.
- Occupation(s): Engineer, inventor, entrepreneur, founder of Eastern Acoustic works (EAW).
- Employer: Eastern Acoustic Works
- Spouse: Christine Chiacu-Forsythe
- Children: 3

Kenton "Ken" George Forsythe (July 21, 1944 – July 9, 2023) was an American engineer and professional audio pioneer, known for developing high performance loudspeakers for the sound reinforcement industry.

== Early years ==
Born in Boston, he graduated from Yale University in 1966 with a degree in History and UC Berkeley in 1968 with a Master of City Planning.

== Forsythe Audio ==
In the mid-1970s Forsythe introduced the Forsythe Audio SR215 dual 15-inch bass horn. The major innovation of the SR215 is that it could fit through a 30-inch door. Forsythe developed two-way compact loudspeaker systems. He designed vented subwoofer that featured an interchangeable tube venting system allowing the enclosure to be reconfigured for different drivers.

== Eastern Acoustic Works (EAW) ==
In 1978, Forsythe and Kenneth Berger co-founded Eastern Acoustic Works (EAW) in Framingham, Massachusetts.

== Death ==
Kenton Forsythe died on July 9, 2023, at the age of 78.
