= Dixon Drums =

Drum and drum hardware manufacturer based in Taipei, Taiwan

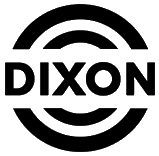
- Company type: Private
- Industry: Musical instruments
- Founded: 1979; 47 years ago in St. Louis, Missouri, USA
- Headquarters: Taipei, Taiwan
- Products: Drum kits, drum hardware
- Parent: Reliance International Corporation
- Website: playdixon.com

Dixon Drums is a drum and drum hardware manufacturer based in Taipei, Taiwan, founded in 1979. They are distributed in the United States by St. Louis Music.

Grammy Awards winning drummer Gregg Bissonette endorses Dixon drums.

== Drum lines ==
In 2011, Dixon launched its current drum set line up consisting of Riot, Spark, Fuse, Blaze, and Artisan.
