= E. K. Blessing =

American musical instrument company

E. K. Blessing is a manufacturer of wind instruments and accessories. The company was founded in 1906 by Emil Karl Blessing. Located in Elkhart, Indiana, their products include trumpets, cornets, flugelhorns, mellophones, euphoniums, trombones, and mouthpieces for brass instruments.

== History ==
The company's founder was Emil Karl Blessing, Sr. (b Oppelsbohn, Württemberg 24 April 1880; d Elkhart 24 Sept 1954). He immigrated to America in 1896 and came to Elkhart. His first experience in the industry was working for Buescher, and it is said that he helped Gus Buescher design his first piston valves. Blessing worked for the Mennonite Publishing House in 1899 and 1900. He then went to Chicago and in 1903 his name appears on a payroll sheet for Frank Holton. During his early years in the US he also worked for several tool and die firms. In 1906 Blessing returned to Elkhart and began making musical instruments in a small garage. For many years the operation was quite small. By 1926 the operation was officially known as the Emil K. Blessing Company. By 1936 it had become known as the E. K. Blessing Band Instrument Company. In 1940 it had incorporated, and in 1942 the name was changed to the less cumbersome E. K. Blessing Company, Inc. Emil was president of the company up to his death in 1954, and he was succeeded by his son E. Karl Blessing, Jr. In 1961 Paul E. Richards merged Blessing with the Martin Band Instrument Company and F. A. Reynolds to form the "Roundtable of Music Craftsmen" (RMC). Karl Blessing remained plant manager during the RMC years. The arrangement collapsed in 1964, and Blessing reverted to its previous identity. Merle O. Johnson, who married one of Blessing's daughters, became the new president. For many years Blessing made student line brass instruments and marketed student model saxophones from other manufacturers under their own name. Merle Johnson later sold the company to his son Randy Johnson, and in 2009, Randy sold E. K. Blessing Inc. to Verne Q. Powell Flutes, Inc.

In 2010, under the ownership of Verne Q. Powell Flutes Inc., E. K. Blessing has completely redesigned its student trumpets (BTR-1266, BTR-1277), created a new line of intermediate trumpets (BTR-1460) and introduced the first truly professional trumpet made by E. K. Blessing since the 1960s (BTR-1580).

In 2015, E. K. Blessing Brass was sold to St. Louis Music. The almost new Elkhart plant was closed and the craftsmen laid off. In 2018, the company was endorsed by Doug Woolverton.

== Sources ==
Elkhart city directories (available Elkhart Public Library)McMakin, Dean "Musical Instrument Manufacturing in Elkhart, Indiana" (unpublished typescript, 1987, available Elkhart Public Library)The Elkhart Truth, Saturday 25 September 1954, obituary of E.K. BlessingInterviews with Blessing employees
