= Gau =

Gau or GAU may refer to:

== People ==
- Gaugericus (c. 550–626), Bishop of Cambrai
- Dalton Gau, American politician
- Gau Ming-Ho (born 1949), Taiwanese mountaineer
- Franz Christian Gau (1790–1854), German architect and archaeologist
- James Gau (born 1957), Papua New Guinean politician
- John Gau (producer) (1940–2024), British television producer
- Michael Gau, Taiwanese politician
- Susan Shur-Fen Gau (born 1962), Taiwanese psychiatrist

== Places ==
- Gäu, name of the South German loess landscapes
- Gau (territory), German term for a shire (regional administration)
- An Administrative division of Nazi Germany
- Gäu (Baden-Württemberg), a region in the southwest German state of Baden-Württemberg
- Gaū, Iran, a village in Sistan and Baluchestan Province
- Gäu District, district of Solothurn, Switzerland
- Gau Island, an island in Fiji
- Gau Airport
- Lokpriya Gopinath Bordoloi International Airport (IATA code: GAU), in Guwahati, Assam, India

== Schools ==
- Georgetown American University, in Guyana
- Girne American University, in Northern Cyprus
- Gazipur Agricultural University in Bangladesh
- Gujarat Ayurved University, in India
- University of Göttingen (German: Georg-August-Universität Göttingen), in Germany

== Other uses ==
- Gau (Final Fantasy VI), a character in Final Fantasy VI
- GAU, a codon for the amino acid aspartic acid
- Gouais blanc, a French wine grape
- Enfariné noir, a French wine grape
- General Assistance Unemployable, a Washington state unemployment program
- Kondekor, a variety of the Ollari language with ISO 639-3 code gau
- Gau, a Cantonese vulgar word
- Glavnoe Artilleriyskoe Upravlenie (literally, Main artillery directorate), a division of the Russian military that played a significant role in the history of radar

== See also ==
- Gau Mata, sacred cows in Hinduism
