= LOUD Audio =

American audio company

LOUD Audio, LLC
- Type: Private company
- Industry: Audio technology
- Founded: 1988; 38 years ago (as Mackie Designs, Inc.)
- Headquarters: Bothell, Washington, United States
- Key people: Carolyn Hommer (Senior Vice President of Business Operations), Greg Harriman (Vice President of Finance & Accounting), Steve Coons (Vice President of Engineering), John Li (Vice President of Global Operations)
- Brands: Mackie
- Number of employees: 70 worldwide
- Website: loudaudio.com

LOUD Audio, LLC is a professional audio company based in the United States, operating in the U.S., Europe, Canada, and Shenzhen, China. Originally founded as Mackie Designs, Inc., the name was changed to Loud Technologies Inc in 2003 to differentiate its founding subsidiary, mixing console manufacturer Mackie from its eponymous brand name.

Between 2003 and 2018, LOUD Technologies owned or distributed several music instrument and pro audio product brands that it had acquired over the years. Transom Capital Group acquired the company in October 2017, renaming it LOUD Audio, LLC and within 12 months had divested itself of brands Ampeg, Martin Audio and EAW, leaving Mackie as the sole surviving subsidiary.

In December 2023, Freedman Electronics Pty Ltd, or RØDE Microphones, acquired LOUD Audio, LLC and all related entities. While RØDE Microphones is based out of Sydney, Australia, LOUD Audio, LLC maintains its physical locations in Bothell, Washington (USA), Victoria, BC (Canada) and Shenzhen (China).

== History ==
2003-2017 Logo

=== Origin ===
Greg Mackie founded Mackie Designs, Inc. in 1988, following the success of his first two professional audio equipment companies, TAPCO and AudioControl. Focused on the goal of producing a reasonably-priced high-quality mixer, he produced the company's first product, the LM-1602, in his three bedroom condominium in Edmonds, Washington.

=== Early growth ===
Mackie Designs, Inc. experienced tremendous growth over the next four years, with sales growing from $3.8 million to over $64 million. This success began with moving production to a proper factory for their second product, the CR-1604 mixer. The CR-1604's feature set, performance, and competitive price was an ideal fit for a wide range of applications, resulting in hundreds of thousands of units sold over the course of the next five years, and accounting for over 48% of Mackie's overall revenues at that time.

The company's ongoing growth of more than 100 percent annually necessitated relocating and expanding manufacturing every year. By 1994, the company had grown into a 30,000 square-foot factory. The following year, as they celebrated the sale of the 100,000th Mackie mixer, the company moved into an even larger 90,000 square-foot factory and invested in automated assembly machines to achieve high productivity and quality with lower overall production costs. With just 8 products (all mixers), Mackie Designs, Inc. completed an initial public stock offering

=== Diversification and acquisitions ===
At the July 1996 NAMM Show, Mackie Designs product introductions marked its first entry into power amps, and active studio monitors, while also expanding into higher-end, large-format mixing consoles. The following year marked the introduction of the Digital 8-Bus Recording Console - the company's first digital product, and the Human User Interface (HUI) control surface, co-developed with Digidesign for Pro Tools.

From 1998-2000 the company began expanding beyond the Mackie brand, acquiring Radio Cine Forniture S.p.A. (RCF) in 1998 and leveraging RCF technologies to develop Mackie's first powered loudspeaker, the SRM450, the following year. In 2000 the company acquired well-established commercial sound reinforcement system manufacturer Eastern Acoustic Works (EAW). By 2001, loudspeakers accounted for 55% of the company's total revenues.

In 2000, Mackie Designs completed the purchase of Acuma Labs for an undisclosed sum. Acuma had been contracted by Mackie Designs for its services for several years before being acquired for its technology and scientists.

In 2001, the company entered the professional audio production market with the purchase of Sydec, and created the Mackie Broadcast Professional line of products.

=== Behringer lawsuit ===
Mackie Designs sued Behringer GmbH on June 18, 1997 alleging trademark and trade dress infringement, copyright and patent infringement, and unfair competitive practices by two U.S. entities, a German company, their chief executive officers and others. The lawsuit sought $109 million USD in actual damages up to $327 million USD in total damages under the law.

By 1999, lawsuit had been dismissed in Behringer's favour noting that "Mackie's circuit board designs were not covered by the U.S. copyright office".

Mackie's lawsuit against Behringer UK similarly failed with Justice Pumfrey concluding "citizens of the United States of America are not entitled to design right under the CDPA unless habitually resident in the European Union or one of the comparatively limited list of qualifying countries".

=== Equity investment and rebranding ===
In February 2003 after declining sales and 7 consecutive quarters of per-share losses, Sun Capital Partners acquired 65% of the company, and subsequently delisted from NASDAQ. Greg Mackie left the board, remaining only in a consulting role.

Six months later, in July 2003, the company issued layoff warnings to 200 manufacturing employees and planned to outsource manufacturing of key products.

In September 2003 the parent company was rebranded as LOUD Technologies, Inc. to avoid confusion between the parent company and the Mackie brand.

=== Further acquisitions and divestments ===
In December, 2003, LOUD divested itself from its Italian operations, including RCF.

In March 2005, LOUD acquired St. Louis Music, including Ampeg, Crate Amplifiers, Alvarez Guitars, and Knilling orchestral string instruments, and continued St Louis Music operations as an indirect wholly owned subsidiary. In March 2007, LOUD acquired Martin Audio.

In November 2008, U.S. Band and Orchestra Supplies Inc. acquired St. Louis Music (SLM) and Knilling from LOUD, with LOUD retained ownership of Alvarez, Ampeg, and Crate. The following year, SLM entered into an agreement with LOUD to exclusively sell and market Alvarez Guitars.

=== Ownership change and renewed focus ===
In October 2017, Transom Capital Group acquired all LOUD Technologies brands and rebranded the company as LOUD Audio, LLC. At the time of the announcement, Transom had promised to invest and grow each of the brands but the following year, Transom completed three divestments to focus exclusively on its core Mackie brand, selling Ampeg to Yamaha Guitar Group, Inc. in May, Martin Audio to Lloyds Development Capital in July, and EAW to the RCF Group in September of that year.

In 2019, LOUD Audio announced that Mark Ureda had joined its board of directors after recently retiring as SVP at Harman Professional.

=== Move from Woodinville to Bothell ===
At its peak, LOUD Audio operated out of two side-by-side buildings in Woodinville, Washington: Mackie Designs I (89,147 RSF) and Mackie Designs II (81,250 RSF) housing all company operations. With the inevitable shift of manufacturing from USA to Mexico to China and the sale of several of its brands, LOUD downsized its US operations and relocated to Bothell, Washington in 2019. LOUD still resides in the same location today (in late 2026).

=== Past leadership ===
- Jamie Engen, former CEO (2003 - 2008)
- Rodney Olson, former CEO (Aug 2008 - 2010)
- Mark Graham, former CEO (Oct 2010 - 2018)
- Ty Schultz, former Managing Partner, Transom Capital Group (2015 - June 2021)
- Ralph Quintero, former VP of Sales and Marketing (Feb 2020 - Dec 2021)
- Alex Nelson, CEO (Aug 2020–Aug 2024), former Mackie President and General Manager (2006 - 2020)
- Danny Olesh, CTO (Mar 2021–Feb 2023)
- Mark Ureda, Director (Jan 2019–Nov 2023)

== Brands ==
=== Current ===
- Mackie

=== Former ===
- Alvarez Guitar
- Ampeg
- Austin Guitar
- CRATE Audio
- EAW
- EAW Commercial
- Knilling Instruments
- Mackie Broadcast
- Martin Audio
- Rhythm Art
- RCF
- SIA Software
- SLM Marketplace
- Tracktion

=== Defunct ===
- Blackheart
- Crate Amplifiers
- TAPCO (by Mackie)
