= St. Louis Music =

American audio equipment manufacturer

- Type: Private
- Industry: Musical instruments
- Founded: as Kornblum Brothers Music; St. Louis, Missouri, United States (1922; 104 years ago)
- Founder: Bernard Kornblum
- Headquarters: St. Louis, Missouri, United States
- Key people: Mark Ragin (chairman & CEO)
- Products: Electric, acoustic, & classical guitars Acoustic & electric bass guitars Drum kits Brasswinds; Strings
- Brands: List: Alvarez; Antigua; Austin Guitars; Bentley Guitars; Dixon Drums; E. K. Blessing; Hamilton; Knilling; P. Mauriat
- Revenue: $39.5 Million (2018)
- Number of employees: 75
- Parent: U.S. Band & Orchestra Supplies, Inc.
- Website: www.stlouismusic.com

St. Louis Music (SLM) is a manufacturer and distributor of musical instruments, accessories, and equipment. SLM distributes products from over 260 music products industry brands, is the corporate owner of several string- and brass-instruments brands, and is the producer and exclusive worldwide distributor of Alvarez and Alvarez-Yairi guitars.

== History ==
=== Early years (1920―1927) ===
Bernard Kornblum was a violinist who at the age of 19 emigrated from Vienna, Austria to St. Louis, Missouri. After working at a music store and as a necktie salesman, he purchased a shipment of instruments and accessories in response to a newspaper advertisement placed by German musical instrument wholesaler Seibenbrun. Due to falling exchange rates, Kornblum's purchase cost him less than anticipated and made it possible for him to offer the goods to music instrument retailers in St. Louis at exceptionally low prices. Following the successful sale of his initial shipment of inventory, Kornblum established himself with other manufacturers, and by 1922, he established a downtown office for his new import business and quit his other job. Within two years, the company also employed Bernard's sister Erna and his brother David, operating under the Kornblum Brothers Music name, and the business flourished during the 1920s, moving into expanded facilities twice by 1927.

=== Supply and distribution expansion (1929―1959) ===
In 1929, while Bernard and David established European distribution headquartered in Belgium, Erna acquired sheet music wholesaler St. Louis Music Supply, with Kornblum Brothers Music assuming the St. Louis Music Supply name. In 1938, Erna and her husband Jack moved to California, and the Kornblum brothers ceased their efforts in Europe, returning to the US. St. Louis Music Supply, now 20 employees strong, expanded its product offerings to include band instruments, sheet music, and accessories. SLM survived the World War II-era by diversifying and selling paint, leather goods, and fine writing instruments. After World War II, the company expanded distribution of musical instruments with the addition of brands like Harmony guitars, Kay guitars, Regal ukuleles, York Band Instruments, Zildjian cymbals, and Turner microphones. In 1954, SLM became a distributor of Thomas organs.

=== Rock and Roll era (1961―1974) ===
Bernard's son Gene joined the company full-time in 1961, and the birth of Rock and roll and the mainstream popularity of bands like The Beatles created unprecedented demand for products like drum sets and guitars. Under Gene's direction, rather than only distributing the same products as other distributors, St. Louis Music became the exclusive distributor for Trixon Drums and developed the Apollo Drums brand. Additionally, SLM became a regional distributor for Magnatone guitars and amplifiers. In 1968, Gene Kornblum met Japanese luthier Kazuo Yairi through a Japanese trading partner, resulting in handmade acoustic guitars produced under the Alvarez-Yairi brand and attracting endorsements from notable guitarists such as Roy Clark and Waylon Jennings, with Alvarez later expanding into electric guitars. In 1971, the company acquired exclusive distribution rights to the Elka Rhapsody string synthesizer and moved into expanded facilities on Ferguson Avenue. At the same time, St. Louis Music refined its processes for importing unfinished string instruments with final assembly and setup in the U.S..

=== SLM Electronics, Crate, and Ampeg (1975―1987) ===
When Magnatone went out of business in the mid 1970s, St. Louis Music worked to develop a new guitar amplifier business. In 1975 SLM partnered with local electronic technician John Karpowicz to develop an electric guitar with interchangeable signal processing modules, resulting in the Electra MPC (Modular Powered Circuit) Guitar, unveiled at The NAMM Show in 1976. SLM bought Karpowicz's service and repair shop and established the SLM Electronics division.

While visiting a Crate & Barrel store in Chicago, Gene Kornblum saw products displayed using packing crates and had the idea of making guitar amplifiers housed in wooden cabinets, resulting in Crate Amplifiers first product, the ponderosa pine encased CR1 guitar amplifier, in 1978. St. Louis Music chose to manufacture the amps themselves rather than outsource manufacturing overseas, and the success of the CR1 grew into a full line of Crate amplifiers for guitar, bass, and keyboards. SLM Electronics moved into a dedicated facility in 1980, and a larger facility in 1986, while also developing the Audio Centron line of PA systems and mixers for live sound reinforcement.

In 1986, St. Louis Music acquired pioneering bass amplification brand Ampeg from bankruptcy and reintroduced the SVT tube bass amplifier with original specifications and refinements. In 1987, the company changed its name to St. Louis Music, Inc.. In 1992, SLM opened a new 20,000-foot R&D facility, and a second Yellville, Arkansas manufacturing facility two years later. In 1996, a 3rd generation of the Kornblum family, Ted Kornblum, joined the company.

=== Guitar brands and distribution ===
From the 1970s through the early 2000s, St. Louis Music (SLM) imported and distributed a wide range of electric and acoustic guitars, primarily manufactured in Japan and later South Korea. The company acted as the exclusive or primary U.S. distributor for several brands and also sold instruments under its own house brands.

Notable brands distributed or revived by St. Louis Music include:

- Electra – SLM began marketing guitars under the Electra brand in 1971, using various Japanese factories to manufacture them until forming a dedicated partnership with Matsumoku Industrial Co. Ltd in Japan in 1981.
- Westone – Through its partnership with Matsumoku, SLM became the official distributor of Westone guitars in the United States in 1982. The Electra brand was merged into Westone in 1984.Westone guitars continued to be manufactured in Korea after Matsumoku closed in 1987.
- Univox (revival) – In the 1980s, SLM revived the Univox name for a series of Korean-made copies of classic designs, including the Hi-Flier and Coily models.
- Bently – A house brand imported by SLM from approximately 1983 to 1998, offering entry-level to mid-range acoustic, electric, and bass guitars, as well as banjos and mandolins, primarily manufactured in Korea and later Romania.
- Series 10 – An extension of the Bently brand for electric guitars only, used by SLM in the late 1980s and early 1990s for Korean-built electric guitars and basses, ranging from beginner Stratocaster and Telecaster copies to superstrat models.
- Austin – Acquired by SLM from Hohner in 1998, Austin is a house brand specializing in affordable acoustic and electric guitars, manufactured primarily in Asia and inspected at SLM facilities.
- Crate – During the 1990s, SLM sold a small line of Korean-made electric guitars and basses under the Crate brand, often bundled with Crate amplifiers.
- Dixon – From 2004 onward, SLM served as the exclusive North American distributor for the German Dixon brand of affordable acoustic and electric guitars.

SLM also briefly distributed Japanese-made Aria Pro II guitars in the mid-to-late 1980s and handled electric models under the Alvarez and Sigma by Martin brands.

Most of these instruments were manufactured by South Korean factories such as Cort and Samick and were marketed as affordable alternatives to higher-priced American and Japanese guitars during the 1980s and 1990s.

=== Guitar brands and distribution ===
From the 1970s through the early 2000s, St. Louis Music (SLM) imported and distributed a wide range of electric and acoustic guitars, primarily manufactured in Japan and later South Korea. The company acted as the exclusive or primary U.S. distributor for several brands and also sold instruments under its own house brands.

Notable brands distributed or revived by St. Louis Music include:

- Electra – After the original Electra company ceased operations in 1982, SLM acquired the brand name and produced a line of Korean-made Electra and Electra-Westone guitars from approximately 1984 to the early 1990s.
- Westone – Beginning in 1987, SLM became the U.S. distributor for the Westone brand, initially importing Japanese-made instruments from Matsumoku and later Korean-made models after the factory closed that year.
- Univox (revival) – In the 1980s, SLM revived the Univox name for a series of Korean-made copies of classic designs, including the Hi-Flier and Coily models.
- Series 10 – A house brand used by SLM in the late 1980s and early 1990s for Korean-built electric guitars and basses, ranging from beginner Stratocaster and Telecaster copies to superstrat models. Some models were fitted with SLM's "Bendmaster" vibrato system which originally had been designed for the Westone brand but later was expanded as an OEM option to other brands other than SLM brands.
- Crate – During the 1990s, SLM sold a small line of Korean-made electric guitars and basses under the Crate brand, often bundled with Crate amplifiers.
- Austin – Acquired by SLM from Hohner in 1998, Austin is a house brand specializing in affordable acoustic and electric guitars, manufactured primarily in Asia and inspected at SLM facilities.

SLM also briefly distributed Japanese-made Aria Pro II guitars in the mid-to-late 1980s and handled electric models under the Alvarez and Sigma by Martin brands.

Most of these instruments were manufactured by South Korean factories such as Cort and Samick and were marketed as affordable alternatives to higher-priced American and Japanese guitars during the 1980s and 1990s.

=== Ownership changes (2005―2008) ===
In March 2005, after a two-year search for potential buyers, St. Louis Music was sold to LOUD Technologies for USD$38.4M in cash and stock. At the time, SLM was generating USD $85M in annual revenue, and had 350 employees in its combined service and headquarters, warehouse, engineering offices, and manufacturing plants in Missouri and Arkansas.

In November 2008, U.S. Band and Orchestra Supplies, Inc. acquired St. Louis Music and its divisions of Knilling string instruments and Austin guitars from LOUD Technologies, Inc., and in March of the following year announced it would be doing business as St. Louis Music in the original SLM facility on Ferguson Avenue.

=== Modern era (2009―present) ===
In 2015, SLM acquired E.K. Blessing Brass and Hamilton Stands. In 2018, the company acquired Alvarez Guitars, DEG Music Products, Inc. and HW Products, and secured exclusive North American distribution rights for Antigua Winds.

== Awards ==
- 2015, Music Inc. "Supplier Excellence Award"
- 2017, Music Inc. "Supplier Excellence Award"
