= Eastern Acoustic Works =

American audio equipment manufacturer

- Founded: 1978; 48 years ago

Eastern Acoustic Works (EAW) is an American manufacturer of professional audio reinforcement tools, such as loudspeaker systems and processors. From 1978 to 1988 it was located at 59 Fountain Street in Framingham, Massachusetts, and subsequently One Main Street in Whitinsville, Massachusetts. It is now headquartered at 19 National Drive in Franklin, Massachusetts.

== History ==
Eastern Acoustic Works was co-founded in 1978 by partners Kenneth Berger and Kenton Forsythe, who had previously worked together at Forsythe Audio.

EAW's first single enclosure system was the CS-3 designed for Carlo Sound in Nashville, Tennessee. It combined a B-215 dual 15-in low-frequency horn, a MR102 12-in mid-frequency horn and a Community BRH90 high frequency horn into one gigantic box, and was the first commercially available horn-loaded single enclosure box system.

In the late 1970s and 80s, EAW’s MK, FR, and KF Series loudspeaker systems were pivotal in the industry. In 1985 EAW became famous by developing the KF850 loudspeaker system. For many years this system was the standard among loudspeakers used for professional touring shows. Carlo Sound and Sun Sound were among the first regional sound rental companies to receive the KF850's.

EAW also became well known for creating custom loudspeaker designs for specific projects and applications. Since its earliest days, Eastern Acoustic Works has always been defined by an ongoing quest to redefine the state of the art in loudspeaker systems that offer practical solutions targeted toward professional sound reinforcement users and installers. Technologies developed for these designs have led to the development of many of EAW's standard products, including the ADAPTive line, which are mainly used in professional and commercial sound reinforcement applications, such as concert venues, music and dance clubs, theaters, stadiums, theme parks, and houses of worship.

In 2000 EAW was purchased by Mackie Designs, Inc., now called LOUD Audio, LLC.

In 2018, EAW was purchased by RCF audio, to be run as a separate entity. Aspects of the organization that had previously been outsourced in the name of saving money were brought back in-house, while a renewed focus on product quality and integrity was implemented.

Today, the company is building a path back towards its pre-millennium status, seeking to become, as TJ Smith, President of EAW, puts it, “the No.1 North American loudspeaker brand.”

== Current People ==
- TJ Smith, President
