= Gauss Speaker Company =

The Gauss Speaker Company, later known as Cetec Gauss, was a Sun Valley loudspeaker company. They were approved by Fender Musical Instruments Corporation and found widespread use among rock musicians of the 1960s through the 1990s^{[cite?]}. The company is notable for its technical improvements in driver design, which include the use of two spiders at once. The former factory of Cetec Gauss was taken over by SWR Sound Corporation in January 1999.
