= Mackie (company) =

Brand of professional audio equipment

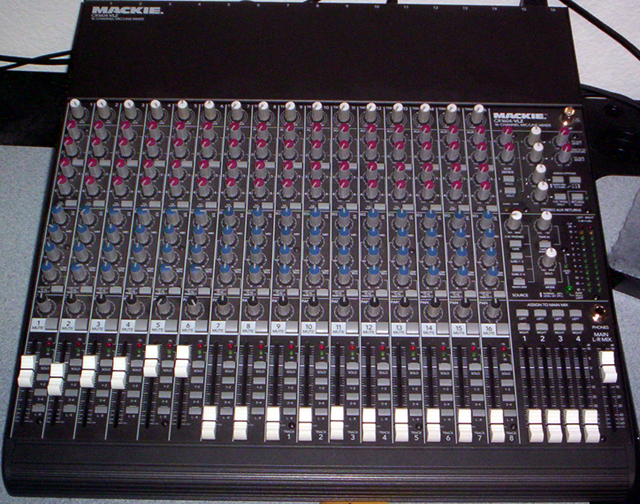

Mackie is an American professional audio products brand. Founded in Seattle in 1988 by Greg Mackie, a manufacturer of affordable and versatile compact pro audio mixers, Mackie is the primary product line of LOUD Audio.

== History ==
Mackie Designs, Inc. was founded in Woodinville, Washington by Greg Mackie, an ex-Boeing worker who began making pro audio gear and guitar amps in his spare time. After founding the small line mixer manufacturer TAPCO, and later the home audio processor manufacturer AudioControl, Mackie founded Mackie Designs, Inc., designing and manufacturing affordable and versatile compact pro audio mixers under the Mackie brand in his three bedroom condominium in Edmonds, Washington. Mackie's first product was the LM-1602 line mixer, priced at $399.

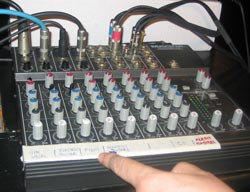
Mackie Micro Series 1202 mixer

Following the moderate sales success of the LM-1602, the company moved to a true factory in 1991 to produce and release its follow-up model, the CR-1604. With the flexibility to be used as either a desktop or rackmount mixer (a new concept at the time) combined with solid performance and competitive price, the CR-1604 was purchased for use in a wide variety of markets and applications. The CR-1604 became a tremendous success, selling hundreds of thousands of units by 1996 and accounting for over 48% of Mackie's overall revenues at that time, and in 2004, it was inducted into the TECnology Hall of Fame, an honor given to "products and innovations that have had an enduring impact on the development of audio technology."

During this time, Mackie remained squarely in the mixer category, introducing 8-Bus mixing consoles for multitrack recording and live sound production in 1993. Mackie took advantage of the Seattle area's plentiful electronic and engineering subcontractors and utilized automated assembly machines to achieve high productivity and quality with lower overall production costs. At the time, the company was growing more than 100 percent annually, forcing Mackie to relocate and expand manufacturing every year, and by 1994 Mackie had grown into a 30,000 square-foot factory to accommodate over 250 employees and US$35.5 million in annual revenues.

In 1995 Mackie celebrated the milestone of having sold its 100,000th mixer and moved into a 90,000 square-foot factory. The company completed an initial public stock offering, and introduced the Ultra-mix Universal Automation System for 8-bus consoles at the AES Convention later that year.

By 1996, Mackie was diversifying, adding veteran industry designer Cal Perkins to the team and diversifying into power amps, powered mixers, and active studio monitors. In 1999, benefiting from Mackie Designs' acquisition of Radio Cine Forniture S.p.A., Mackie introduced the SRM450 powered loudspeaker, and by 2001, speakers accounted for 55% of Mackie sales.

Having made a host of pro audio gear, Mackie launched its first ever microphone on January 16, 2020, the Mackie EM91C (E standing for element) which spurned a host of other microphones. The EM91C was unique in that it was Mackie's first attempt at a microphone, and its low price point in comparison to its user reviews and build quality. Subsequently, Mackie went on to make the EM91CU, a USB version, the EM89D (a cardiod dynamic handheld microphone) and the EM99b (a dynamic broadcast microphone).

== 1604-VLZ Pro ==
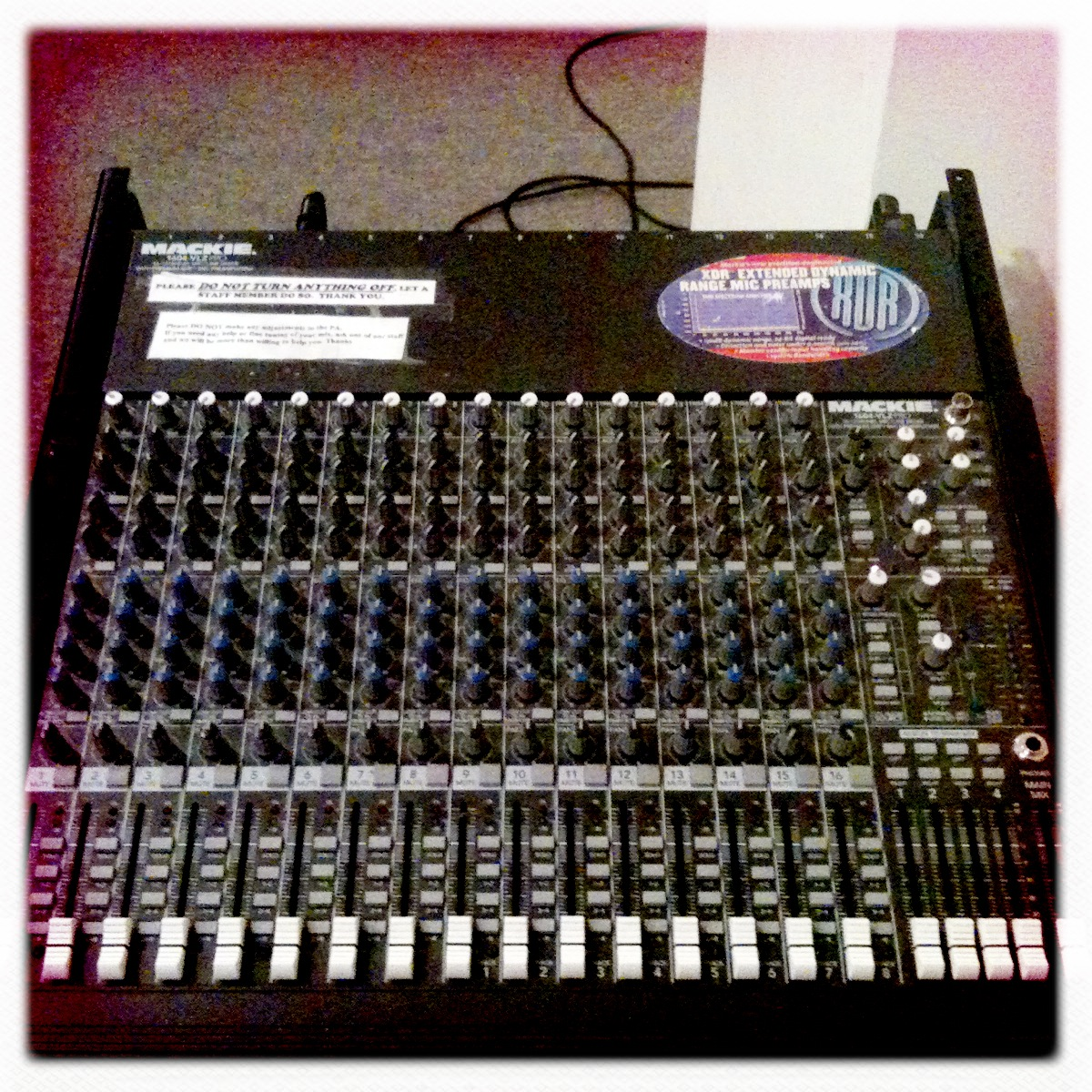
Mackie 1604-VLZ Pro 16-channel Mic/Line mixer

The 1604-VLZ Pro is a compact analog mixer manufactured by Mackie. It features sixteen input channels, four output sub-groups, and a user-replaceable fuse. Each of the input channels features a high-quality microphone preamplifier.

== Name change ==
In 2003, company management renamed Mackie Designs, Inc. as LOUD Technologies, Inc. (now known as LOUD Audio) to avoid confusion between the parent company and the Mackie brand.

== Acquisition ==
On December 4, 2023, Mackie was purchased by RØDE Microphones.

== Known VLZ Series Technical Problems ==
In 2020, a post by user "LincolnG" on Gearspace.com (formerly Gearslutz.com) initiated an online conversation that revealed a design flaw in the Mackie's Onyx chip used in the VLZ Series mixers. Others contributing to the conversation shared their experiences anecdotally and it was subsequently tested, verified, and documented, by "LincolnG" that the VLZ Series mixers do in fact have a design flaw that affects the stereo imaging. In the intervening years several others have verified the findings of "LincolnG".

== See also ==
- List of studio monitor manufacturers
- Mackie 1604-VLZ Pro
