= RCF audio =

Italian audio equipment manufacturer

- Founded: 1949
- Headquarters: Reggio Emilia, via Raffaello 13, ITA
- Products: Professional Audio
- Number of employees: > 250
- Parent: RCF Group
- Website: www.rcf.it

RCF S.p.A. (formerly Radio Cine Forniture - R.C.F. S.r.l.) is a widely recognized Italian manufacturer of high performance audio products including power amplifiers, loudspeakers, digital mixers and digital signal processors (DSP).

== History ==
RCF is an Italian audio products manufacturer founded in 1949 in Reggio Emilia, Italy. The first products sold were microphones and electroacoustic transducers (loudspeakers). In the late ’60s, concert sound was going electric, and many loudspeaker pioneers were searching for high-powered devices to use in their designs. RCF was one of the first European OEM suppliers for international brands, thanks to the experience built on high power transducers. After a few years, thanks to the in-depth know-how in loudspeaker technology, RCF began to develop and produce sound reinforcement systems under the same brand.

The introduction of the ART Series, in 1996, has established RCF among the few global manufacturers of active loudspeakers. The TT+ High Definition - Touring and Theater series equipped with DSP, introduced in 2004, and the RDNet Networked Management technology, gained RCF full recognition in the professional audio market. Since 2017, all DSP active speakers incorporate FiRPHASE technology, which allows achieving a 0° linear phase playback. RCF is the first audio manufacturer to have a complete catalogue of 0° phase-compatible sound systems including line arrays.

RCF gave its name to the RCF Arena, the largest permanent outdoor concert arena in Europe.

== Professional Audio Systems ==
- ART 3/4/7/9 - Portable Speakers
- Nx Series - Professional Speakers with Wood Cabinet
- D-Line & HDL - Professional Portable Speakers
- EVOX - Column Array Portable Speakers
- Max Series - Hi Performance Speakers for Entertainment
- Sub Series
- Analog Mixer series
- Digital Mixer series
- TT+ Audio - High Performance Touring & Install Systems for large-size, high quality applications
- Studio Monitoring AYRA PRO / MYTHO / Iconica headphones

== System Integration ==
- Installed Audio
- Commercial Audio
- Business Music Series
- Forum Congress
- EN54 Systems
- VSA - Vertically Steerable Array
- COMPACT Series - Premium Install Speakers

== Transducers ==
- Precision Transducers

== See also ==
- List of companies of Italy
