= Charlie Hughes (sound engineer) =

American inventor and audio engineer (born 1965)

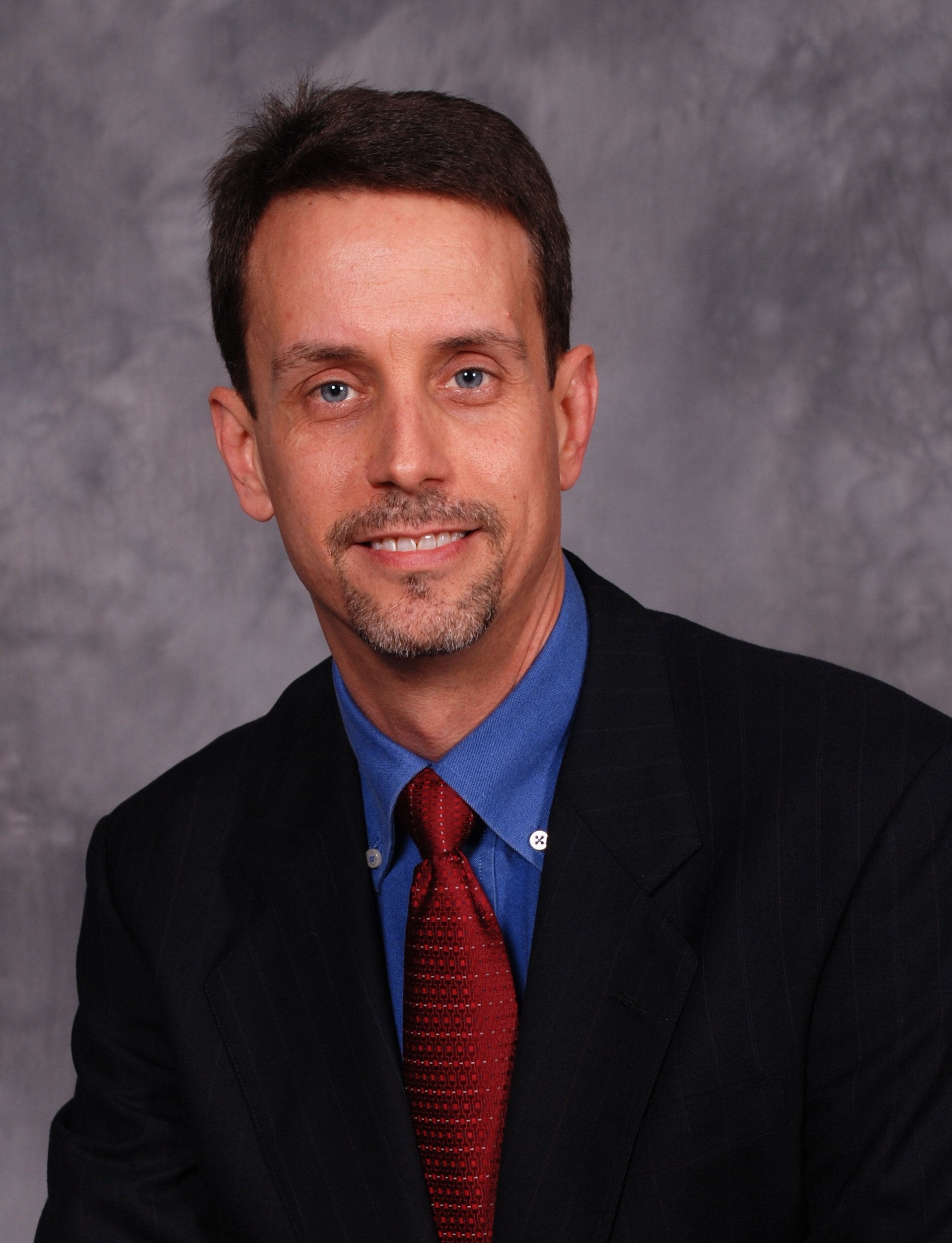
- Born: Charles Emory Hughes II; February 13, 1965 (age 60); Jackson, Mississippi
- Occupations: Audio engineer, inventor, standards expert
- Employers: Peavey Electronics; Altec Lansing
- Spouse: Beth Fleeman Hughes
- Children: 2
- Website: http://www.excelsior-audio.com/

Charles Emory Hughes II (born February 13, 1965) is an American inventor and audio engineer. He is known for his work on loudspeaker design, and the measurement of professional audio sound systems. Hughes first worked for Peavey Electronics designing loudspeakers and horns where he was granted a patent for the Quadratic-Throat Waveguide horn used in concert loudspeakers. He worked for Altec Lansing for two years as chief engineer for the pro audio division and was granted two more patents. In 2021, Hughes was hired by Biamp as principal engineer.

Hughes designs loudspeakers and performs contract engineering for Excelsior Audio as co-owner. He is an expert consultant in audio measurement and analysis software and systems. He has led committees in prominent standards organizations to develop technical standards for the measurement, modeling and production of audio equipment.

== Career ==
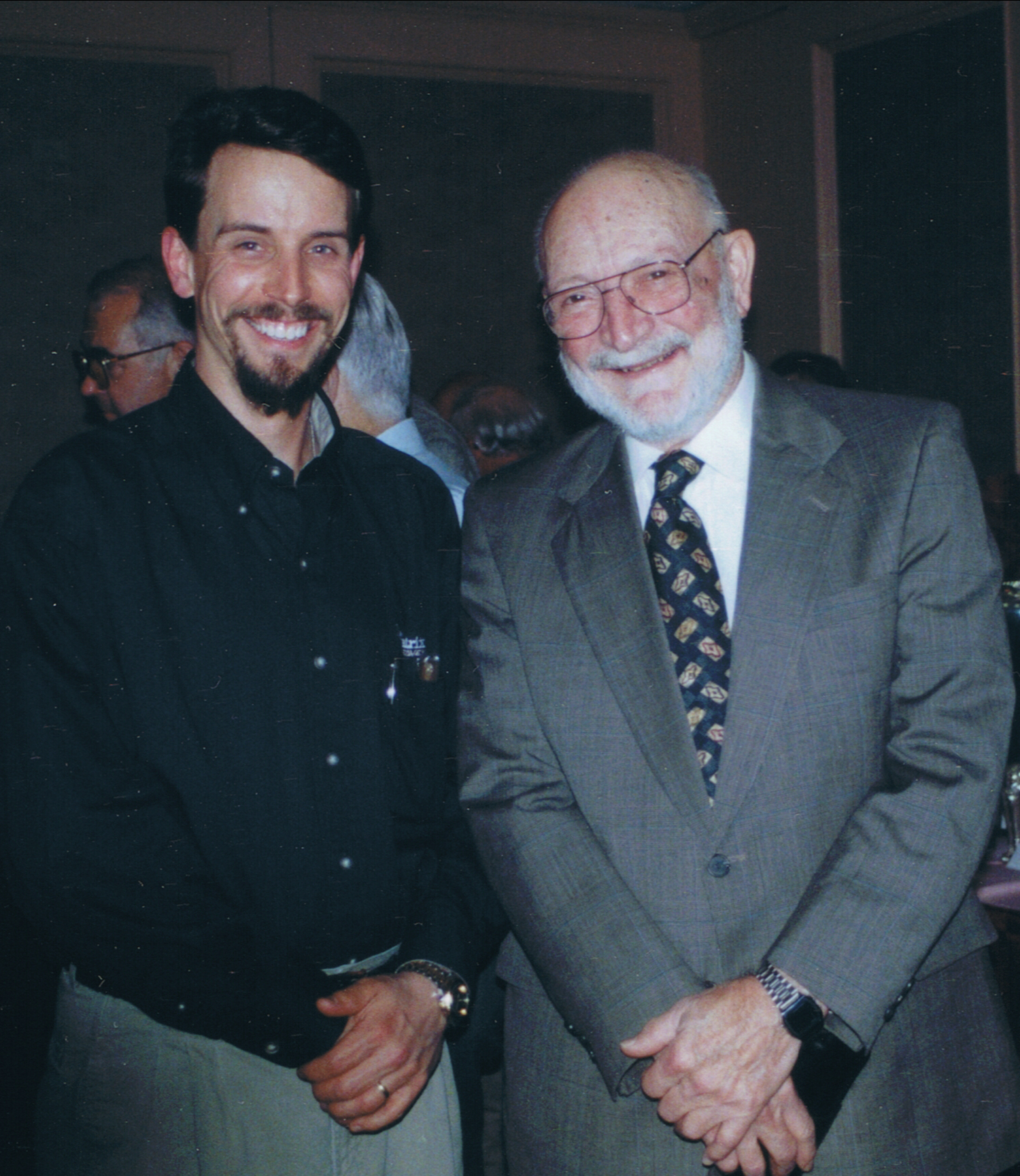
Hughes with Gene Patronis in 2000

Hughes studied physics at the Georgia Institute of Technology including audio engineering under Dr. Eugene "Gene" Patronis. He helped maintain WREK, the campus radio station, and he spoke on the air as talent. His senior project was a 3-way loudspeaker system that Hughes describes as sounding good but looking shabby because of his poor woodworking skills. He graduated in 1988 with a bachelor's degree in physics. Following college, Hughes was hired by Peavey Electronics in Meridian, Mississippi, where he worked for almost 14 years.

=== Peavey ===
At Peavey, Hughes served as a loudspeaker designer and the main horn designer for loudspeaker enclosures. He developed a new horn design as a means to improve linearity in mid- and high-frequency reproduction. The design was primarily a simple conic section except that its throat was curved in a circular radius arc to match the desired throat size for proper mating to the compression driver. The mathematical formula describing the cross-sectional area expansion was a quadratic equation:

$$S = Ax^{2} + B\sqrt{r^{2} + x^{2}}\ + C$$

This quadratic equation suggested to Hughes the name of the horn design: the Quadratic-Throat Waveguide (QT waveguide). Instead of increasing the horn mouth size with a flare to control midrange beaming, a relatively thin layer of foam covering the mouth edge was found to suit the same end. The QT waveguide, when compared to popular constant directivity (CD) horns, produced about 3–4 dB lower levels of second harmonic distortion across all frequencies, and an average of 9 dB lower levels of the more annoying third harmonic distortion. Being without a diffraction slot, the QT waveguide was free from problems with apparent apex, making it arrayable as needed for public address purposes. In New York City, Hughes presented a paper on the technology at the Audio Engineering Society convention in September 1999. His patent for the QT waveguide was provisionally filed on March 5, 1999, and granted on May 9, 2000.

At Peavey, Hughes measured the results of his horn experiments, and he analyzed the total performance of multiple-driver loudspeakers, especially with regard to tuning the crossover to obtain optimum results. In this measurement he used TEF, a professional acoustical measurements and instrumentation system first made by Techron, a division of Crown International, then sold to Gold Line. TEF is a system that incorporates Richard C. Heyser's time delay spectrometry (TDS) method to analyze sound waves. In 1998, Hughes was appointed to the advisory committee of Gold Line's TEF division. As of 2008 he was still on the advisory committee. Hughes also programmed in MATLAB, a computing environment that allowed him to visualize the complex output pattern of a loudspeaker system under test. He used MATLAB to optimize crossovers to achieve smoother directivity results at the crossover transition region. Toward this end, Hughes developed a software tool called PolarSum which eliminated much of the drudge work of taking a great many polar plot measurements. Hughes also used Enhanced Acoustic Simulator for Engineers (EASE), a 3D simulation tool which was developed by Wolfgang Ahnert and Stefan Feistel of Germany.

Hughes involved himself early with the more practical aspects of operating sound systems. He served as head sound engineer and sound designer at the Meridian Little Theatre from 1989. Beginning in 1991, Hughes teamed with Peavey Product Manager Mick Donner to form Meridian SoundWorks, a local sound reinforcement company providing gear and engineering to mix concerts, corporate and political events, and theatrical productions. Meridian SoundWorks also provided sound system design and optimization for permanent installations. The experience allowed Hughes to assess the performance of sound gear in real-world applications.

In 2000, Hughes became an instructor of TEF II systems, part of a team that included Don Eger and Russ Berger.

=== Altec ===
Hughes joined Altec Lansing in May 2002 to serve as senior engineering manager in the professional audio division. This included both component-level and overall product engineering for the installation market as well as for touring systems. While at Altec, Hughes was granted two patents. The first was a patent for the optimum spacing of driver elements in a line array, using a minimum of drivers. This technology, marketed as "InConcert", was at the core of Altec's compact computer speaker system FX 6021, a satellite and subwoofer system which used the patented process for its two satellite speakers, each containing six drivers mounted vertically. The two center drivers covered the frequency range from 150 hertz up to 20 kHz, the next two drivers above and below covered up to 6 kHz, and the top and bottom drivers covered up to 1 kHz. This allowed for good sounding results with six drivers mounted on a columnar surface that could physically accommodate eight or nine. Hughes' third patent, his second with Altec, was a patent for a dipole and monopole surround sound speaker system which used indirectly aimed drivers added to the top of the usual front left and front right loudspeakers. Altec brought the technology to market as the GT 5051R—a 3.1 system which included a center speaker and a subwoofer. The front left and right speakers bounced surround information off of the walls and ceiling for customers who did not want to clutter their listening space with a pair of rear speakers.

=== Excelsior Audio ===
Hughes left Altec in late 2004 to co-found Excelsior Audio in North Carolina. He serves as managing director.

=== Biamp ===
Biamp, an audio electronics and media networking manufacturer in Beaverton, Oregon, hired Hughes in May 2021 as principal engineer of the electroacoustics division. Biamp had recently bought Community Professional Loudspeakers of Pennsylvania, and Apart Audio of Belgium, to broaden the Biamp loudspeaker portfolio.

== Audio measurement and analysis ==
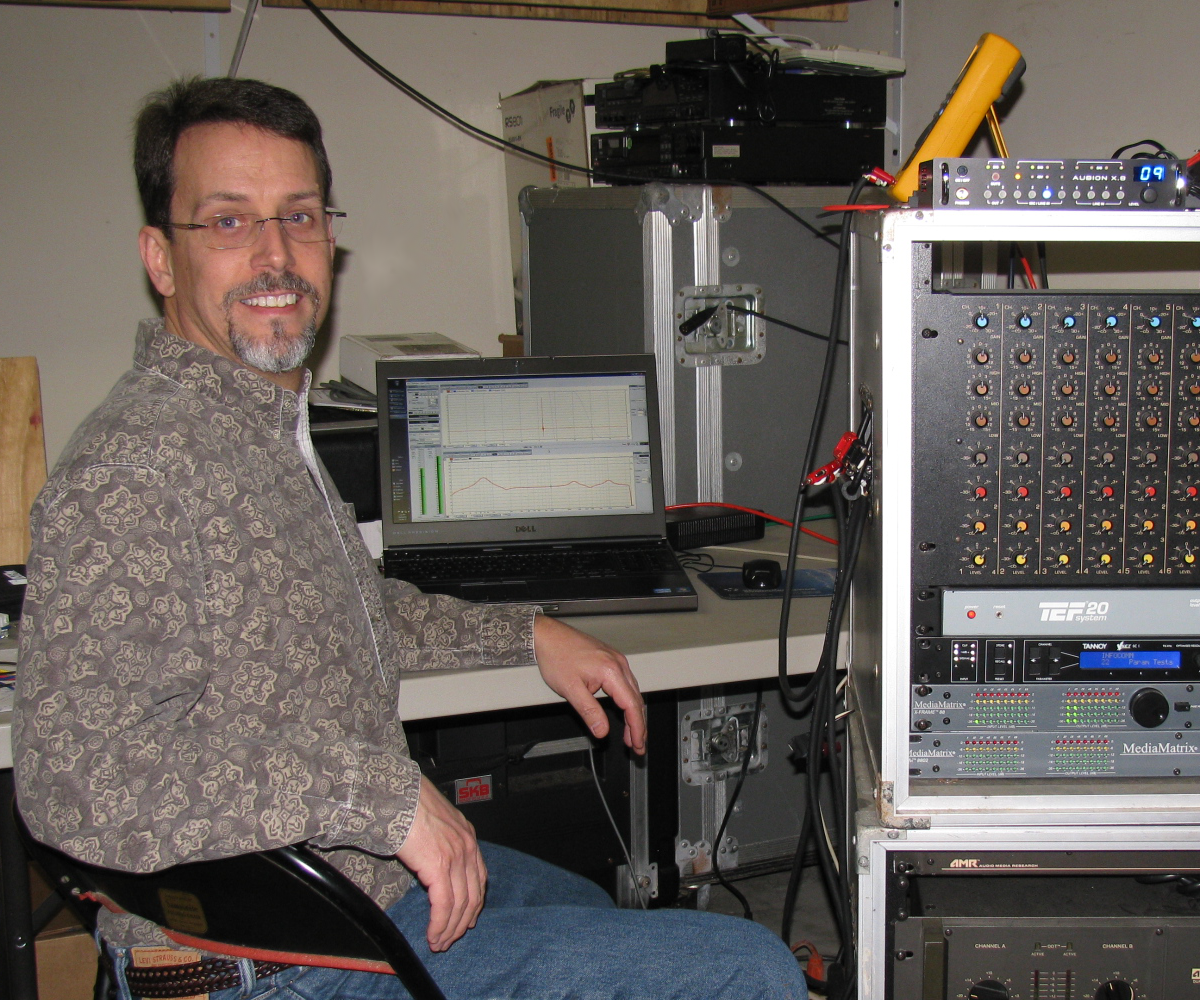
Hughes in 2013 with audio test and analysis equipment

The EASE simulation software that Hughes had been using for years came under management by the Ahnert Feistel Media Group (AFMG) in early 2006. At the beginning of 2011, AFMG brought Hughes on board to consult on software development and to join their team of product support and advanced training experts. Hughes supports AFMG software products such as EASE, EASERA, SysTune and SpeakerLab. Through AFMG, he trains and supports customers of Renkus-Heinz audio products.

== Professional associations ==
Since 1994 Hughes has been a member of the Audio Engineering Society. He has contributed to four standards committees: SC-02-01 (Digital Audio Measurement Techniques), SC-04-01 (Acoustics and Sound Source Modeling), SC-04-03 (Loudspeaker Modeling and Measurement), SC-04-08 (Sound systems in rooms). After his first paper in 1999, he teamed with Ahnert, Feistel, and Bruce Olson to present a paper in New York in 2007 on simulating the directivity of loudspeakers. In 2008 in San Francisco he took part in a panel discussion about the state of the art in loudspeaker design in profession sound reinforcement. The panel included consultant Tom Young, Tom Danley of Danley Sound Labs, Aleš Dravinec of ADRaudio, Dave Gunness of Fulcrum Acoustics, and Pete Soper of Meyer Sound Laboratories. Hughes also gave a talk called "Loudspeaker Directivity Improvement Using Low Pass and All Pass Filters." In New York in 2009, Hughes once again spoke in a panel of experts on the state of live sound loudspeakers. In San Francisco in 2010, Hughes chaired a panel discussion about achieving directionality with subwoofers; the panel was composed of Dravinec, Steve Bush from Meyer, Dave Rat of Rat Sound, and Bill Gelow from Bosch Communications. Hughes also participated in a panel discussion composed of Peter Mapp, Floyd Toole and Kurt Graffy comparing objective audio measurement results with subjective methods. In New York in 2011 he revisited the topic of subwoofer directionality as a member of a panel including Jim Risgin of On Stage Audio, Paul Bauman of JBL, and consultant Doug Fowler.

Hughes is a member of the Consumer Electronics Association Standards Committee. In 2006, he served as chairman of the sound measurement working group which established testing methods and marketing specifications for subwoofers. Hughes pushed for standardization so that consumers would not be confused by incompatible specifications between subwoofer brands. He said, "Consumers trying to interpret figures from two different manufacturers are in a quandary. The numbers may be the same, but they may sound completely different." In October 2013, the CEA honored Hughes at their Technology & Standards Awards Dinner in Los Angeles, naming him as the 2013 recipient of the Technology & Standards Achievement Award, recognizing his contributions to the advancement of "new technologies or significant enhancements to existing technologies." The award acknowledged Hughes' leadership in producing the guideline CEA-2034, Standard Method of Measurement for in Home Loudspeakers.

Beginning in the 1990s, Hughes joined a LISTSERV discussion hosted by SynAudCon, an audio training organization, and he assisted SynAudCon in training students. As well, he wrote articles for SynAudCon's newsletter. Hughes also joined another industry LISTSERV called Live Audio Board (LAB), hosted by Dave Stevens, a live audio engineer. The LAB was bought by ProSoundWeb (PSW), and Hughes submitted articles for publication by PSW. Hughes also writes for Live Sound International, a magazine published by PSW. Hughes is a member of the Acoustical Society of America.

== Personal life ==
Hughes graduated from William B. Murrah High School in Jackson, Mississippi. He moved to Atlanta to attend the Georgia Institute of Technology. Upon graduation he moved to Meridian, Mississippi, to work for Peavey. On May 27, 1989, he married Beth Fleeman. First a daughter, Tori, then a son, Ben, were born in Mississippi. The family moved to Milford, Pennsylvania, in mid-2002. In late 2004, the family moved to Gastonia, North Carolina—the hometown of Beth—where Hughes established Excelsior Audio. In December 2012, Hughes presented his daughter at the Gastonia Debutante Ball.
