= List of bass amplifier and loudspeaker manufacturers =

This article lists manufacturers of bass amplifiers, loudspeakers, and other amplification-related items such as preamplifiers. The amplifiers and loudspeakers used to amplify bass instruments (e.g., the bass guitar, double bass and similar instruments) are distinct from other types of amplification systems due to the particular challenges associated with low-frequency sound reproduction.

This distinction affects the design of the loudspeakers, the cabinet, and the preamplifier and amplifier. Loudspeakers for bass instruments tend to be larger and more heavy-duty, and speaker cabinets have to be built more solidly to prevent unwanted rattling due to the low frequencies. Preamplifiers and amplifiers for bass instruments often have features designed for bass instruments, such as equalizers that go down to 40 Hz or below or limiters to prevent speaker damage.

== Types of manufacturers ==
Bass equipment manufacturers include a variety of different types of companies, ranging from companies that only make individual components to companies that only make bass amplifiers and loudspeakers (e.g., Gallien-Krueger). At the other end of the spectrum are companies that offer bass amplification equipment as part of a much broader offering of different types of instrument amplifiers and public address systems (e.g., Peavey, Carvin A&I or Yorkville Sound.)

Another way of categorizing bass equipment manufacturers is by which part of the market they are targeting. While Peavey and Yorkville products are aimed at the generalist mass market, some bass equipment manufacturers, such as Acoustic Image or Walter Woods make expensive "boutique" equipment that is aimed at a niche market within the professional musician market. Acoustic Image amplifiers and speaker cabinets tend to be used by professional acoustic folk and jazz musicians, and Walter Woods amplifiers are associated with professional acoustic jazz bass players.

== List of manufacturers ==
- Acoustic Control Corporation
- Ampeg
- Ashdown Engineering
- Behringer
- Blackstar Amplification
- Carvin A&I
- Carver
- Crate Amplifiers
- Crown Audio
- Darkglass
- Eden Electronics
- Fender
- Gallien-Krueger
- Hartke
- Hiwatt
- Kustom
- Laney Amplification
- Marshall Amplification
- Mesa/Boogie
- Orange Amplification
- Peavey Electronics
- Roland Corporation
- Sunn
- SWR Sound Corporation
- TC Electronic
- Tech 21
- Teisco
- Trace Elliot
- Traynor (Yorkville Sound)
- Warwick

=== Amplifiers and/or preamplifiers ===
- Alembic (preamps and filters)

== See also ==
- Bass effects
- Bass instrument amplification
