= ADRaudio =

Slovenian speaker system manufacturer

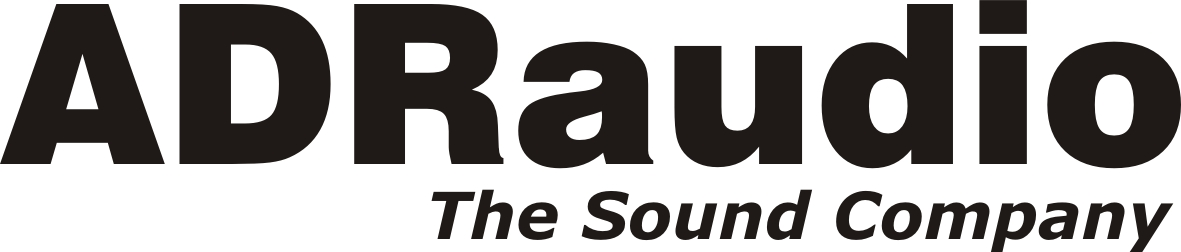
- Company type: Privately held company
- Industry: Audio electronics
- Founded: 2004
- Headquarters: Novo Mesto, Slovenia
- Key people: Franci Pavlin, Ales Dravinec
- Products: Concert loudspeakers
- Website: http://www.adraudio.com/

ADRaudio is a manufacturer of high-end concert loudspeaker systems based in Novo Mesto, Slovenia. They offer a wide range of self-powered products with internal all-analog processing, as well as rackmount signal processors for system integration.

== History ==
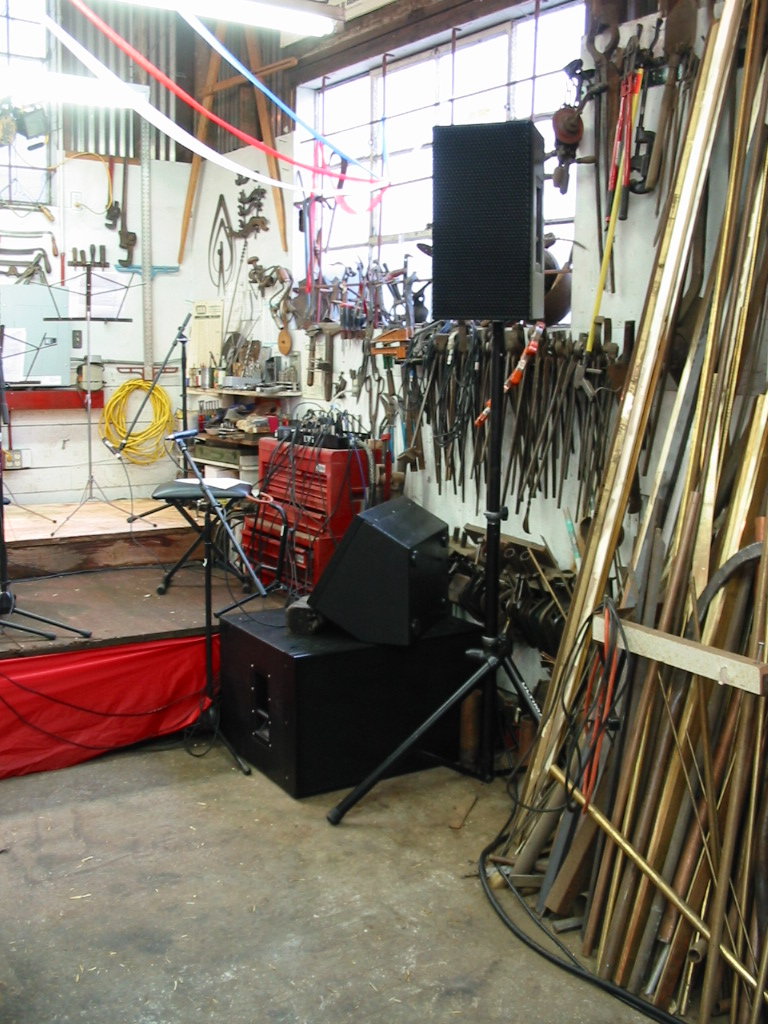
Three ADRaudio loudspeakers in place for a barn dance at a metal smithy

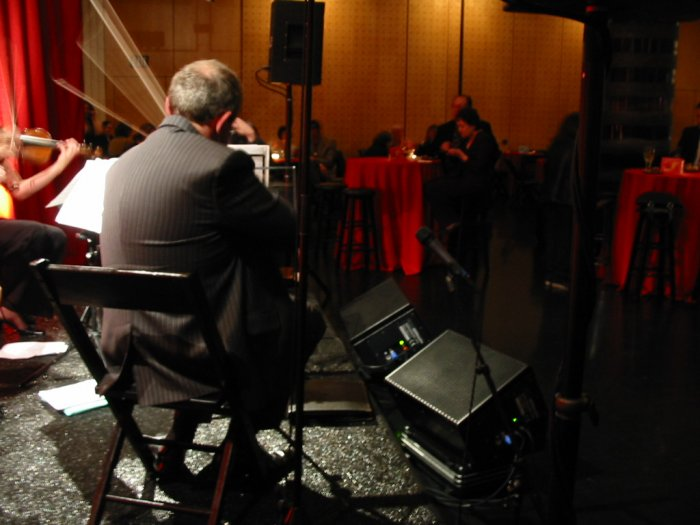
Quartet San Francisco performing at San Francisco Museum of Modern Art, through ADRaudio loudspeakers

EONA ADRaudio was started by General Manager Franci Pavlin and Chief Engineer Ales Dravinec in 2004.

At the 125th AES Convention in San Francisco in 2008, Dravinec joined veteran loudspeaker designers Charlie Hughes (formerly of Altec Lansing and Peavey Electronics), Dave Gunness (formerly of Eastern Acoustic Works and Electrovoice), Pete Soper (of Meyer Sound Laboratories), Ralph Heinz (of Renkus-Heinz) and Tom Danley (has designed for Servodrive, Yorkville Sound, Danley Sound Labs) in a panel discussion, moderated by industry veteran Tom Young, to share thoughts about the art of loudspeaker design in the application of live sound reinforcement. Not certain he would be able to appear at a follow-on seminar in New York City in October 2009, Dravinec declined to add his name to the pre-event announcement. Nonetheless, he appeared as a last minute panelist and rejoined Young, Gunness and Hughes as well as speaker designer Doug Jones, representing Danley Sound Labs.

Jamie Taylor, Managing Director of Australian Event Productions, signed on as the Asia-Pacific distributor in 2008. During the ENTECH trade show in Sydney that year, Pavlin, Dravinec and Prescott came to exhibit the product line. Of the M1225 monitor wedge, Taylor said it "is very loud, yet sounds very well-rounded, and I can pick it up without breaking a sweat! I used these exact wedges on a national level touring band recently, and they nearly tried putting them in their van at the load out!"

In 2018, ADRaudio helped recreate the Grateful Dead's Wall of Sound speaker system for the Grateful Dead tribute act Dead on Live. Jason Dermer of Asbury Audio in New Jersey put the sound system together using five ADRaudio L2821 line array enclosures for each instrument in the band.
