= Power compression =

In a loudspeaker, power compression or thermal compression is a loss of efficiency observed as the voice coil heats up under operation, increasing the DC resistance of the voice coil and decreasing the effective available power of the audio amplifier. A loudspeaker that becomes hot from use may not produce as much sound pressure level as when it is cold. The problem is much greater for hard-driven professional concert systems than it is for loudspeakers in the home, where it is rarely seen. Two main pathways exist to mitigate the problem: to design a way for the voice coil to dissipate more heat during operation, and to design a more efficient transducer that generates less heat for a given sound output level.

High-power audio transducers have a low efficiency, with less than 5% of the amplifier signal turned into sound waves. The other 95% or more of the electrical energy is turned into unwanted heat, which causes the voice coil to increase in temperature. Too much heat – more than 200 °C (390 °F) – can destroy the voice coil, but long before that happens, the loudspeaker will experience power compression. A voice coil made of copper wire will have its DC resistance increase by about 72% when heating up from 20 °C (room temperature) to 200 °C, and its sensitivity will decrease by 4.7 decibels. Silver wire has a slightly worse problem with power compression, while aluminum wire is slightly better.

In multi-way systems, power compression is often observed to occur first in one of the low-frequency bandpasses. This causes the total system to have an imbalance in frequency response, a reduction of level in one bandpass compared to the others. In passive loudspeakers with internal crossover components, power compression will change the electrical characteristics of the crossover filters, and the crossover point can shift, introducing distortions related to an incorrect crossover filter.

To counteract power compression, one solution is to increase heat dissipation. Typical methods include cooling fins on the magnet housing, a larger diameter voice coil, ferrofluid in the gap between voice coil and magnet, venting of the pole piece, metal parts that conduct heat to the outside, increasing the enclosure's internal chamber volume behind the magnet, and electric cooling fans. Another solution is to design a system that increases efficiency, such as by using a horn loudspeaker rather than a direct-radiating design. Or by choosing a transducer other than the voice coil, such as Bruce Thigpen's rotary woofer (1974) or Tom Danley's servo-motor subwoofer (1983).

Power compression is usually considered a long-term problem, arising over time with a strong signal sent to the loudspeaker over an extended period. However, if the change in resistance is short term, observed as heating up and cooling down with each cycle of low-frequency waves, then the loudspeaker will increase in total harmonic distortion.
