= Horn loudspeaker =

Loudspeaker using an acoustic horn

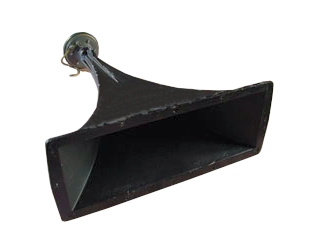
A midrange horn driver used in a home speaker system from Klipsch. The width of the front opening is roughly 46 cm.

How a horn loudspeaker works. (A) compression driver (B) horn

A horn loudspeaker is a loudspeaker or loudspeaker element which uses an acoustic horn to increase the overall efficiency of the driving element(s). A common form (right) consists of a compression driver which produces sound waves with a small metal diaphragm vibrated by an electromagnet, attached to a horn, a flaring duct to conduct the sound waves to the open air. Another type is a woofer driver mounted in a loudspeaker enclosure which is divided by internal partitions to form a zigzag flaring duct which functions as a horn; this type is called a folded horn speaker. The horn serves to improve the coupling efficiency between the speaker driver and the air. The horn can be thought of as an "acoustic transformer" that provides impedance matching between the relatively dense diaphragm material and the less-dense air. The result is greater acoustic output power from a given driver.

The narrow part of the horn next to the driver is called the "throat" and the large part farthest away from the driver is called the "mouth". The angular coverage (radiation pattern) of the horn is determined by the shape and flare of the mouth. A major problem of horn speakers is that the radiation pattern varies with frequency; high frequency sound tends to be emitted in narrow beams with poor off-axis performance. Significant improvements have been made, beginning with the "constant directivity" horn invented in 1975 by Don Keele.

The main advantage of horn loudspeakers is they are more efficient; they can typically produce approximately 10 times (10 dB) more sound power than a cone speaker from a given amplifier output. Therefore, horns are widely used in public address systems, megaphones, and sound systems for large venues like theaters, auditoriums, and sports stadiums. Their disadvantage is that their frequency response is more uneven because of resonance peaks, and horns have a cutoff frequency below which their response drops off. (The cutoff frequency corresponds to the wavelength equal to the circumference of the horn mouth.) To achieve adequate response at bass frequencies horn speakers must be very large and cumbersome, so they are more often used for midrange and high frequencies. The first practical loudspeakers, introduced around the turn of the 20th century, were horn speakers. Due to the development in recent decades of cone loudspeakers which sometimes have a flatter frequency response, and the availability of inexpensive amplifier power, the use of horn speakers in high fidelity audio systems over the last decades has declined.

== Operation ==
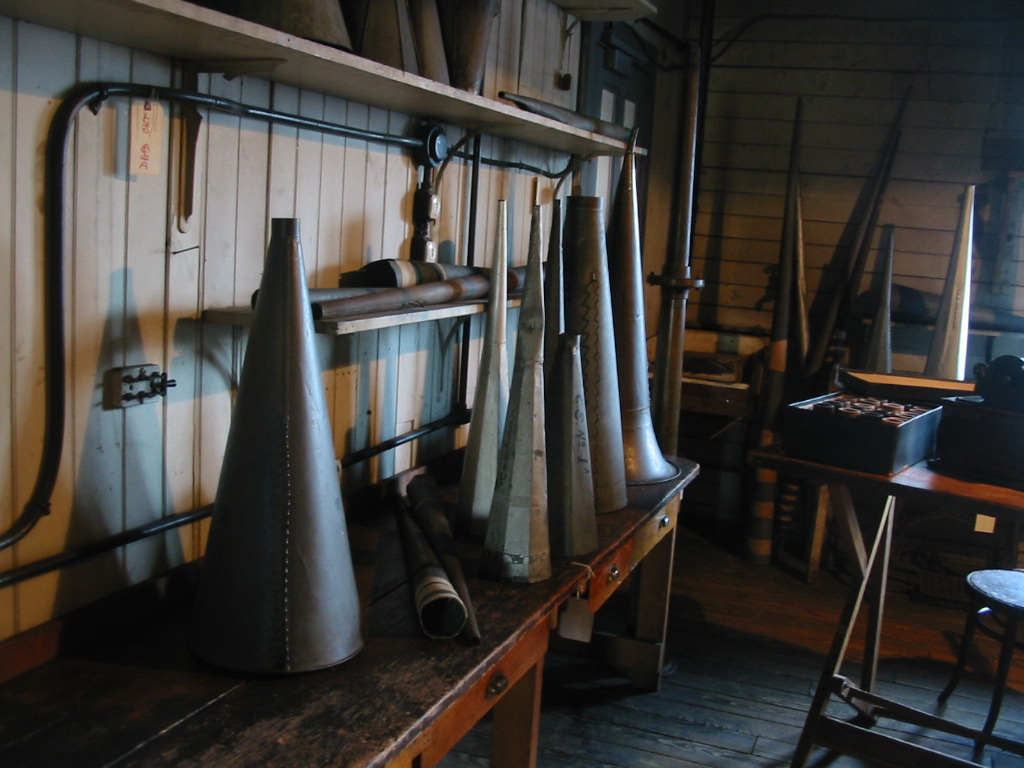
Various horn prototypes in the lab of Theo Wangemann, Thomas Edison's chief horn designer. From about 1888 to 1925, a horn was used to concentrate sound waves in the process of recording onto Edison cylinders, and another horn was used to amplify the recordings during playback.

An acoustic horn converts large pressure variations with a small displacement area into a low pressure variation with a large displacement area and vice versa. It does this through the gradual, often exponential increase of the cross sectional area of the horn. The small cross-sectional area of the throat restricts the passage of air thus presenting a high acoustic impedance to the driver. This allows the driver to develop a high pressure for a given displacement. Therefore, the sound waves at the throat are of high pressure and low displacement. The tapered shape of the horn allows the sound waves to gradually decompress and increase in displacement until they reach the mouth where they are of a low pressure but large displacement.

== Technology history ==
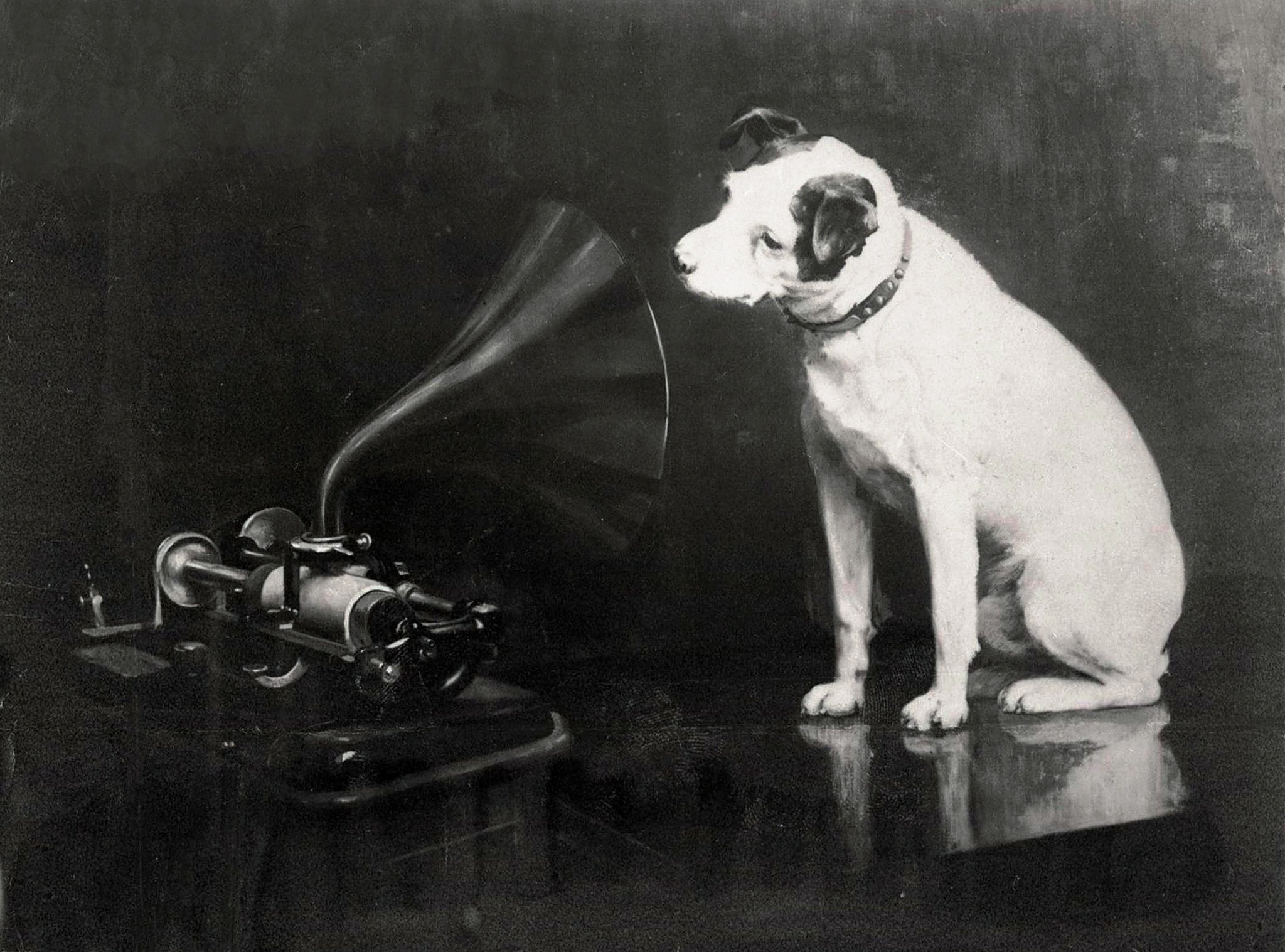
Francis Barraud's original painting of Nipper looking into an Edison Bell cylinder phonograph

The physics (and mathematics) of horn operation were developed for many years, reaching considerable sophistication before WWII. The most well known early horn loudspeakers were those on mechanical phonographs, where the record moved a heavy metal needle that excited vibrations in a small metal diaphragm that acted as the driver for a horn. A famous example was the horn through which Nipper the RCA dog heard "His Master's Voice". The horn improves the loading and thus gets a better "coupling" of energy from the diaphragm into the air, and the pressure variations therefore get smaller as the volume expands and the sound travels up the horn. This kind of mechanical impedance matching was absolutely necessary in the days of pre-electrical sound reproduction in order to achieve a usable sound level.

=== Megaphone ===
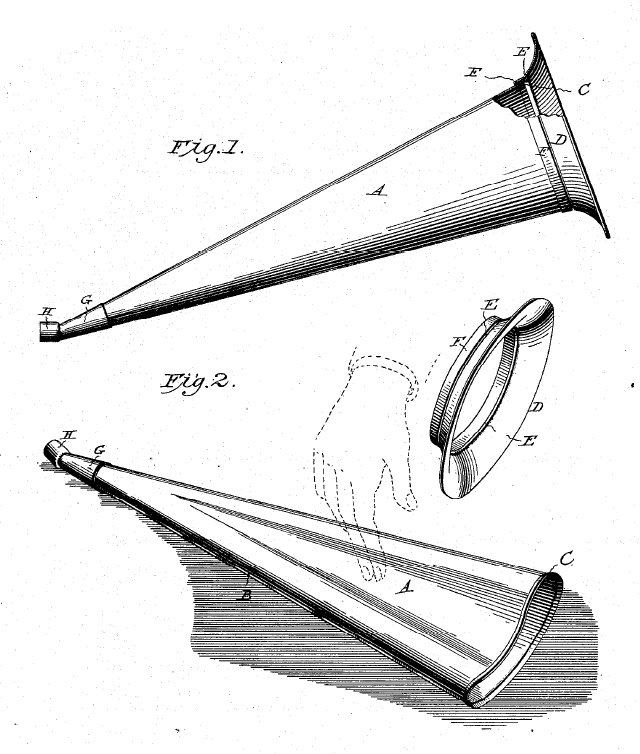
A collapsible cone horn with removable flared bell. This horn was patented in 1901 for gramophone record playback.

The megaphone, a simple cone made of paper or other flexible material, is the oldest and simplest acoustic horn, used prior to loudspeakers as a passive acoustic amplifier for mechanical phonographs and for the human voice; it is still used by cheerleaders and lifeguards. Because the conic section shape describes a portion of a perfect sphere of radiated sound, cones have no phase or amplitude distortion of the wavefront. The small megaphones used in phonographs and as loudhailers were not long enough to reproduce the low frequencies in music; they had a high cutoff frequency which attenuated the bottom two octaves of the sound spectrum, giving the megaphone a characteristic tinny sound.

=== Exponential ===
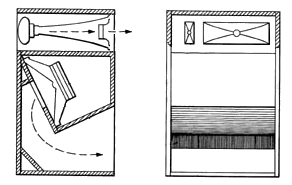
A three-way Klipsch loudspeaker from the late 1970s employing a different exponential horn at each bandpass

The exponential horn has an acoustic loading property that allows the speaker driver to remain evenly balanced in output level over its frequency range. The benefits of the design were first published by C.R. Hanna and J. Slepian in 1924 for the American Institute of Electrical Engineers (AIEE). A major drawback is that the exponential horn allows for a narrowing of the radiation pattern as frequency increases, making for high frequency 'beaming' on axis and dull sound off axis. Another concern is that a throat of small diameter is needed for high efficiency at high frequencies but a larger throat is best for low frequencies. A common solution is to use two or more horns, each with the appropriate throat size, mouth size and flare rate for best performance in a selected frequency range, with sufficient overlap between the frequency ranges to provide a smooth transition between horns. Another solution tried in the late 1930s by Harry F. Olson of RCA was to use multiple exponential flare rates, either by connecting increasingly larger horns in series or by subdividing the interior of a single horn. Exponential horns continue to be used by some designers, and in some applications.

==== Multicell ====
Altec multicell horn models from a 1978 product catalog

A number of symmetrical, narrow dispersion, usually exponential horns can be combined in an array driven by a single driver to produce multicell horns. Patented in 1936 by Edward C. Wente of Western Electric, multicell horns have been used in loudspeakers since 1933 to address the problem of directivity at higher frequencies, and they provide excellent low frequency loading. Their directional control begins to beam both vertically and horizontally in the middle of their target frequency range, narrowing further at high frequencies with level changes as great as 10 dB between lobes. Multicell horns are complex and difficult to fabricate and thus have a higher associated expense. They persisted in public address applications for many years because, even with their faults, they sounded very good, and still do with competent design. The revolutionary coaxial driver, the Altec Lansing Duplex 601 and 604, used a multicell horn for its high frequency component from 1943 to 1998.

==== Radial, sectoral, and diffraction ====
A JBL model 2397 diffraction horn from 1978. The 2397 contained internal sectoral vanes which divided the throat into six exponential sections.

Radial horns have two surfaces based on an exponential flare rate, and two straight walls that determine the output pattern. The radial horn exhibits some of the beaming of the exponential horn. Altec sectoral horns were radial horns with vanes placed in the mouth of the horn for the stated purpose of pattern control. For ease in mounting to loudspeaker cabinets, flat front radial horns have been used, for instance by Community in their SQ 90 high-frequency horn. JBL's diffraction or "Smith" horn was a variation on the radial design, using a very small vertical dimension at the mouth as a method of avoiding the mid-range horizontal beaming of radial horns that have a larger vertical dimension at the mouth.

The diffraction horn has been popular in monitor designs and for near-field public address applications which benefit from its wide horizontal dispersion pattern. Counterintuitively, the narrow vertical dimension provided for an expansive vertical output pattern approaching 90° for frequencies of a wavelength equal to the narrow vertical dimension. A very small version of the diffraction horn was designed in 1991 into the JBL model 2405H Ultra-High Frequency Transducer, yielding a 90° x 35° output pattern at 20 kHz.

=== Tractrix ===
The tractrix horn is very similar in many respects to the exponential horn and has gained adherents among DIY horn enthusiasts, audiophile consumers, and some manufacturers. It uses a curve formula derived by assuming that a tangent to any point on the horn's inner curve will reach the central axis of the horn with a line segment of set length. At the mouth, the tangent line segment becomes perpendicular to the axis and describes the radius of the mouth. This horn concept was studied by Paul G.A.H. Voigt in the mid-1920s and patented in 1927. The size of the tractrix horn is generated by specifying the desired low frequency "cutoff" or limit which will determine the mouth diameter. Two incremental improvements over the exponential horn include slightly better support for low frequency extension and a somewhat broader high-frequency coverage pattern.

=== Constant directivity ===
Don Keele's first constant directivity horn patent was assigned to Electro-Voice in 1978.

In May 1975, to address problems of beamwidth changing at different frequencies, D. Broadus "Don" Keele, Jr. of Electro-Voice introduced a hybrid horn with an exponential expansion rate near the throat followed by a conical expansion section and ending with a rapidly flaring flange at the mouth. The flange at the mouth solved some remaining problems with lobing at higher frequencies. Don Keele specified in one version of his design a wider horizontal flare for pattern control appropriate to public address purposes. Keele's paper set forth the relationships between mouth size, frequency and coverage angle, providing a basis for many future developments of horn design. One problem found with constant directivity horns is that the horizontal coverage pattern cannot be narrowed without making the vertical coverage pattern too small to be useful.

==== Mantaray ====
Subsequent to Keele's work and using his principles, Clifford A. Henricksen and Mark S. Ureda of Altec designed a strikingly different hybrid horn displaying constant directivity traits, the horizontal diffraction or "Mantaray" horn. The Mantaray horn separates desired vertical coverage pattern from horizontal, making it possible to design horns for a variety of coverage patterns. The Mantaray shape starts with a vertically oriented JBL-style diffraction horn, leading into a conical waveguide (earliest designs), or a square or rectangular horn with four planar sides. For midrange beaming control, the outer mouth is expanded further with a short, flared flange in the Keele style, or with added planar sides of a greater flare angle. Low frequency efficiency is not as pronounced as the constant directivity design. Unlike previous designs, the apparent apex, which is the focal point of pattern dispersion, is not the same for every frequency, making for an ellipsoidal wavefront rather than spherical. Because of this, the Mantaray can only be arrayed satisfactorily in one plane (rather than multiple planes). Its abrupt breaks in flare rate causes diffraction, reflection and distortion components.

==== Bi-Radial ====
A 1996 JBL model 2344A Bi-Radial "butt-cheeks" horn with a 100° × 100° output pattern from 1 kHz to 12.5 kHz

By 1980, Keele was at JBL where he took both his and Altec's designs a step further. He mated a JBL-style diffraction horn to a secondary horn consisting of exponentially curved sides derived by using two radial formulas. This resulted in a hybrid constant directivity horn that was free from the distortion components associated with abrupt angle changes. The market responded well to the design in products such as the JBL model 4430 studio monitor with its 100° × 100° model 2344 Bi-Radial high frequency horn often called "butt-cheeks". The Bi-Radial design had problems with apparent apex and arrayability in the same manner as the Mantaray.

==== Twin Bessel ====
Ramsa, the professional audio division of Panasonic Corporation, introduced a twin Bessel constant directivity horn shortly after the Mantaray appeared. The design was very similar to the Mantaray and the Bi-Radial but it used a dual series Bessel expansion formula to determine the flare rate of the secondary horn section.

==== CD horn characteristics ====
Most popular constant directivity horns (also known as CD horns) suffer from non-spherical wavefronts, limitations in arrayability, and distortion at high sound pressure levels as well as reflections and distortions related to the transition from diffraction slot to secondary horn. They tend toward a narrowing of dispersion pattern at the higher frequencies whose wavelengths approach the width of the throat or the width of the diffraction slot.

Because the CD horn's high frequencies are more spread out over its coverage pattern, they appear attenuated relative to other horns. The CD horn requires an equalization boost of approximately 6 dB per octave with a filter knee centered between 2 and 4 kHz (depending on horn design) in order to sound neutral and balanced. Most manufacturers of active electronic audio crossovers responded to this requirement by adding an optional CD EQ boost filter or high frequency shelf filter. For instance, such circuitry was provided via internal jumper links by BSS in their FDS-310 crossover and by Rane in their AC 22S and AC 23B crossovers. Rane allowed for greater front panel control of two bandpasses ("hi-mid" and "high") using CD horn equalization including sweepable frequency range on their AC 24 crossover. Further refinements of the filtering process are available in DSP-based crossovers.

==== Hybrid Constant Directivity (HCD) ====
First published in December 2019 in a Voice Coil article and then at the 148th AES Convention in June 2020, Dario Cinanni presented a new horns family.

The HCD algorithm, already used by SpeakerLAB Horn.ell.a software from 2006, transforms any expansion (exponential, hyperbolic sine, hyperbolic cosine, catenoidal, tractrix, spherical, or a new expansion) horn into a constant directivity horn.

The HCD permits to maintain the same acoustic load of the original expansion. HCD algorithm reduces reflections if compared to a CD horn, or in general to a multiflare horn, providing low distortion at high sound pressure levels.

Similar to the Radial horn HCD offers a constant directivity on one plane, to be specific a progressive constant directivity on the plane along the horn mouth major axis. The progression depends on the selected mouth-ratio. While on the plane along the mouth minor axis we will have an equivalent directivity contour of a circular mouth horn (using the same expansion).

=== Multiple-entry horn ===
A three-way multiple-entry horn in which each passband enters the same horn

In 1996, Ralph D. Heinz of Renkus-Heinz received a patent for a multiple-entry horn which incorporated multiple drivers for two bandpasses, high and mid, whose sound waves all exited into a single horn but at differing distances depending on the bandpass. It was marketed as the "CoEntrant" horn. The mid- and high-frequency drivers in the Renkus-Heinz ST/STX product line both exited through a "Complex Conic" waveguide. In the late 1990s, Thomas J. "Tom" Danley of Sound Physics Labs began working on a three-way multiple-entry horn, bringing the SPL-td1 to market in 2000. The design used seven drivers, with one high frequency driver at the horn's throat, four mid-frequency drivers near the throat and two low frequency drivers ported closer to the horn mouth. In 2001, Tom Danley began developing the "Unity" horn for Yorkville Sound, patenting the improvement in 2002. Following the 2003 release of Yorkville's Unity line, Danley formed Danley Sound Labs and developed a significant improvement over the SPL-td1 called the "Synergy" horn, yielding substantially better phase and magnitude response along with smoother polar pattern. The synergy horn design delivered greater power output from a smaller loudspeaker enclosure. Because the design retains pattern control through its crossover regions and over a large range of its total bandwidth, and because the acoustic center of the design is near the rear of the enclosure, it is more easily combined in arrays for public address applications.

=== Waveguide horns ===
The term "waveguide" is used to describe horns with low acoustic loading, such as conic, quadratic, oblate spheroidal or elliptic cylindrical horns. These are designed more to control the radiation pattern rather than to gain efficiency via improved acoustic loading. All horns have some pattern control, and all waveguides provide a degree of acoustic loading, so the difference between a waveguide and a horn is a matter of judgement.

=== Quadratic-Throat Waveguide ===
In 1999, Charlie Hughes of Peavey Electronics filed for a patent on a hybrid horn he called Quadratic-Throat Waveguide. The horn was basically a simple conic section but its throat was curved in a circular arc to match the desired throat size for proper mating to the speaker driver. Instead of increasing the horn mouth size with a flare to control midrange beaming, a relatively thin layer of foam covering the mouth edge was found to suit the same end. The QT waveguide, when compared to popular CD horns, produced about 3–4 dB lower levels of second harmonic distortion across all frequencies, and an average of 9 dB lower levels of the more annoying third harmonic distortion. Being without a diffraction slot, the QT waveguide was free from problems with apparent apex, making it arrayable as needed for public address purposes.

=== Oblate spheroid waveguide ===
Oblate spheroid waveguide (OSWG) horn designs improve directivity pattern control above 1 kHz, provide a lower frequency of directivity to better match the mid-range driver, and, as claimed by inventor Dr. Earl Geddes, mitigate higher order modes, a form of phase and amplitude distortion. The practical limitation of horn length is explicitly not addressed by the theory of OSWG.

== Applications ==
=== Public address and concert use ===
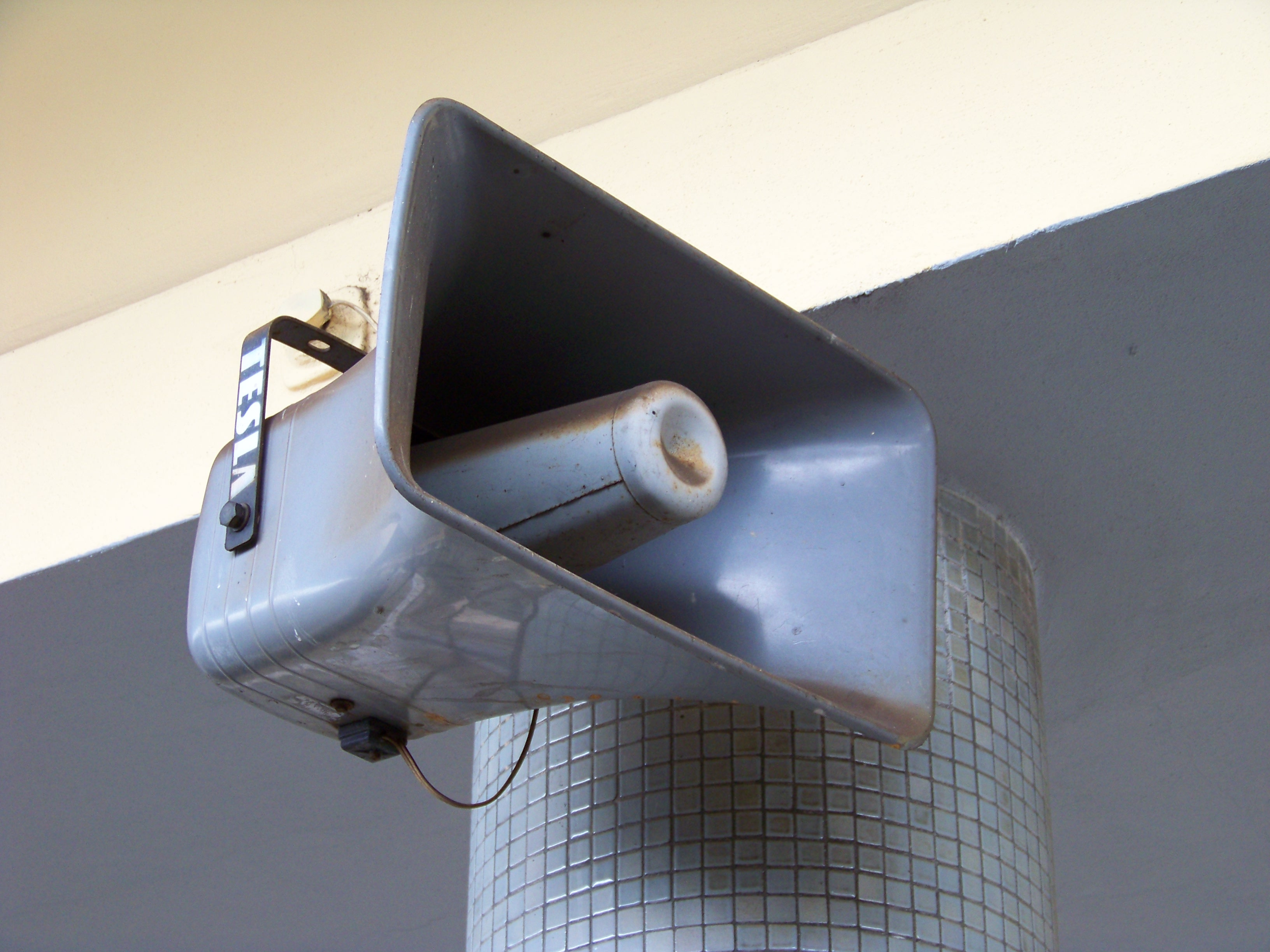
The reentrant (reflex) horn loudspeaker, or bullhorn, is a type of folded horn speaker used widely in public address systems. To reduce the size of the horn, the sound follows a zigzag path through exponentially expanding concentric ducts in the central projection (b, c), emerging from the outer horn (d). Invented in the 1940s.

A TOA-branded reflex horn loudspeaker in a PA system in action

Horn loudspeakers are used in many audio applications. The drivers in horn loudspeakers can be very small, even for bass frequencies where conventional loudspeakers would need to be very large for equivalent performance. Horn loudspeakers can be designed to reproduce a wide range of frequencies using a single, small driver; to some extent these can be designed without requiring a crossover.

Horn loudspeakers can also be used to provide the very high sound pressure levels needed for sound reinforcement and public address applications, although in these high sound pressure applications, high fidelity is sometimes compromised for the sake of the necessary efficiency, and also for the controlled dispersion characteristics which are generally required in most large volume spaces. "Gunness Focusing", a new method of counteracting some of the horn distortions, especially in the time domain, was pioneered by Dave Gunness while he was with Eastern Acoustic Works (EAW). EAW horn-loaded loudspeakers that have been processed with this proprietary system show reduced compression driver diaphragm/phase plug time-smear distortion while retaining high output power and controlled dispersion.

Concert venues often use large arrays of horn loudspeakers for high-volume bass reproduction ("bass bins" or subwoofers), in order to provide bass that concertgoers can not only hear but feel. Combining multiple horn loudspeakers in an array affords the same benefits as having a single horn with a greater mouth area: the low frequency cut-off extends lower as the horn mouth gets larger, and the array has the greater output power of multiple drivers.

=== Commercial theaters ===
Commercial cinema theaters often use horn-loaded loudspeakers for pattern control and increased sensitivity needed to fill a large room.

=== Audiophiles and home use ===
Consumer audio employs horn loudspeakers for controlled directivity (to limit audio reflections from room surfaces such as walls, floor, and ceiling) and for greater speaker sensitivity.

Horn loudspeakers can provide very high efficiencies, making them a good match for very low-powered amplifiers, such as single-ended triode amps or other tube amplifiers. After WWII, some early hi-fi fans went so far as to build low frequency horns whose mouths took up much of a wall of the listening room. The throats were sometimes outside on the lawn, or in the basement. With the coming of stereo in the 1960s, this approach was rarely seen. Many loudspeaker buyers and do-it-yourself loudspeaker fans sought smaller designs for aesthetic reasons.

Some audiophiles use horn loudspeakers for audio reproduction, while others eschew horn systems for their harmonic resonances, finding in them an unpleasant form of distortion. Since there are a variety of horn designs (of differing length, material, and taper), as well as different drivers, it is, to some extent, impossible to give such blanket characterizations to horn loudspeakers. Audiophiles using low power amplifiers, sometimes in the 5 to 25 watt range, may find the high efficiency of horn loudspeakers an especially attractive feature. Conversely, the high sensitivity can also make any background noise present at the amplifier outputs noticeably worse.

Film soundtracks have great dynamic range where peak levels are 20 dB greater than average levels. The high sensitivity of horn loudspeakers aids in achieving movie theater sound levels at the listening position with typical ~100 watts-per-channel receiver/amplifiers used in home cinema.

=== Vehicle use ===
Horn loudspeakers can be mounted on and used by motor vehicles. They are commonly used by emergency vehicles to amplify their sirens and by ice cream trucks to amplify their music. Other uses include mobile public address systems for outdoor events, advertising, or public protests.

== Gallery ==
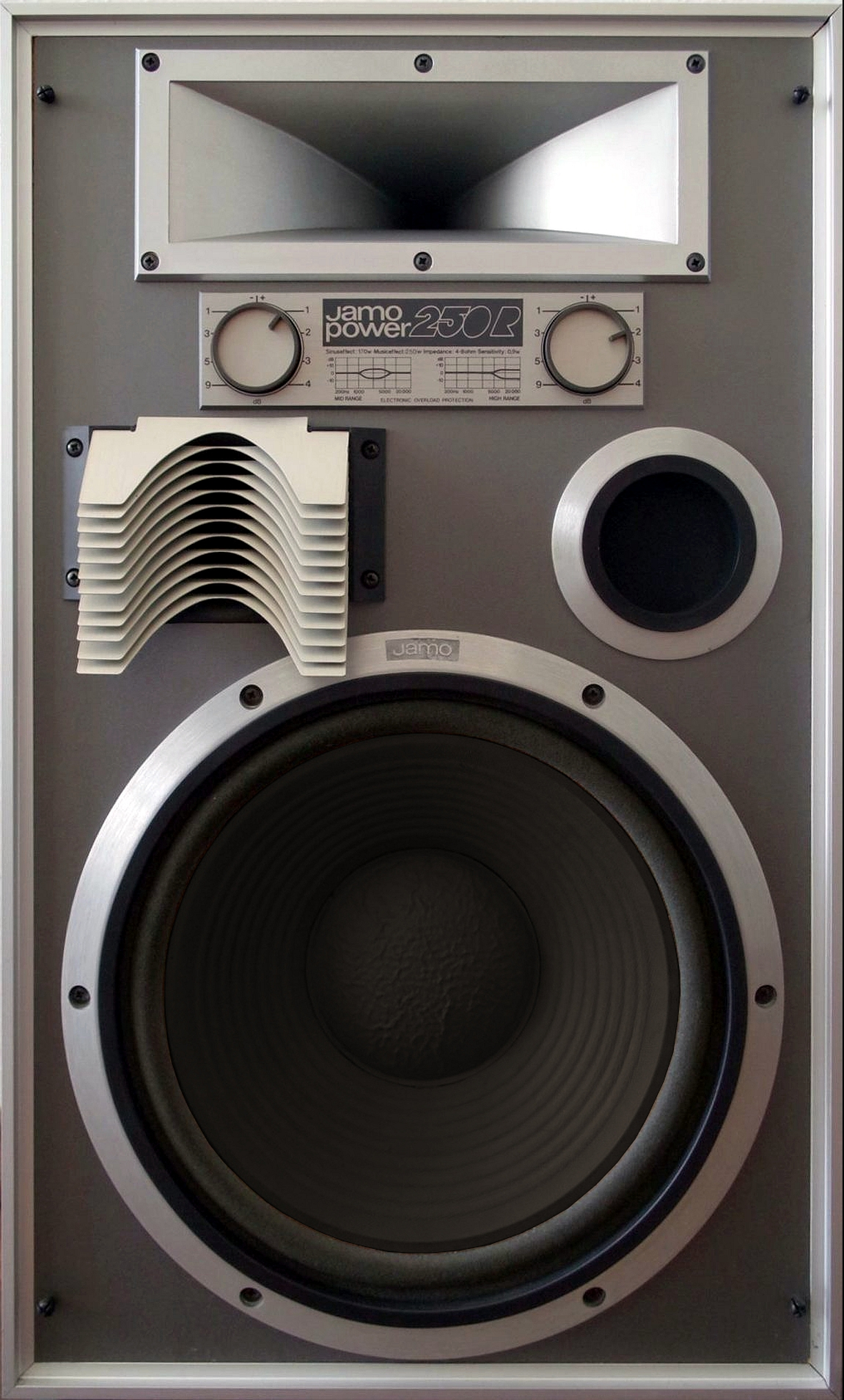
Midprice home audio loudspeakers from Danish company Jamo (today owned by Klipsch), with horns for midrange (top) and tweeter (behind diffusion element), 1980s

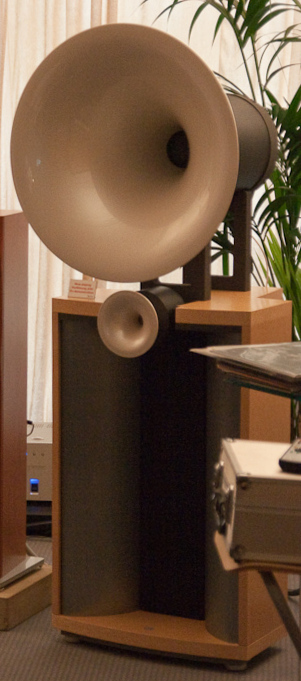
In the Hi-End sector, horn loudspeakers are seen more often due to the sales price being of less concern

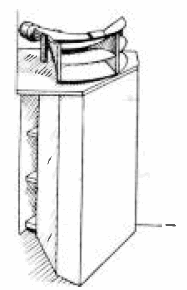
Drawing of a Klipschhorn, which had a triangular back section to fit into the corner of the room

== See also ==
- French horn
- Compression driver
- Super tweeter
- Siren (noisemaker)

== Notes ==
- Ballou, Glen; Cliff Henricksen (1987). "Loudspeakers, Enclosures, and Headphones". Handbook for Sound Engineers: The New Audio Cyclopedia. Indianapolis, Indiana: Howard W. Sams & Co. ISBN 0-672-21983-2.
- Eargle, John M.; Chris Foreman (2002). "Radiating Elements". JBL Audio Engineering for Sound Reinforcement. JBL Pro Audio Publications. ISBN 0-634-04355-2.
- Eargle, John M. (2003). "Horn Systems". Loudspeaker Handbook, 2nd edition. Springer. ISBN 1-4020-7584-7.
- The Quadratic Throat Waveguide: A White Paper On An Invention by Charles E. Hughes of Peavey Electronics Corporation. (2000) John Murray, Peavey Electronics.
