= Pete Traynor =

Canadian musician and sound equipment designer

Pete Traynor (b. Apr. 28, 1940, d. May 7, 2016) was a Canadian guitarist, bassist, businessman and designer of Traynor sound amplification equipment for the music industry.

== Career ==
As a young man, Traynor played guitar in three bands with Robbie Robertson: Robbie and the Robots, Thumper and the Trambones, and The Suedes. He later played with Ronnie Hawkins.

Traynor worked as a repair technician at Long & McQuade's first store in Toronto. In the 1960s he began designing specialized sound amplifiers and other related equipment for the store's customers. His hand-wired bass amplifier, which he called the DynaBass, was in demand, so Traynor teamed with his employer Jack Long to create a company, Yorkville Sound, to manufacture and market the products he designed under the Traynor brand. Another of his designs was the BassMaster tube amplifier.

The Traynor line of equipment has been sold worldwide and is manufactured in Pickering, Ontario.

Traynor died in May 2016 related to undiagnosed diabetes.
