= John M. Eargle =

American recording engineer (1931–2007)

John Morgan Eargle (6 January 1931 in Tulsa, Oklahoma – 9 May 2007 in Hollywood, California) was an Oscar- and Grammy-winning audio engineer and a musician (piano and church and theater organ). He was the Chief Engineer for Delos International, author of seminal textbooks on audio, a consultant (and vice president of engineering) for 31 years at JBL, and past president and fellow of the Audio Engineering Society.

Eargle and his colleague, Mark E. Engebretsen (born 1942), can be directly credited for the revolution in cinema sound reproduction after 1980. They presented a paper to the Society of Motion Picture and Television Engineers demonstrating new concepts in cinema loudspeaker design. This led directly to developments culminating in the THX sound system developed by Tomlinson Holman (born 1946). The Academy of Motion Picture Arts and Sciences awarded the two, and a third colleague, D. B. (Don Broadus) Keele, Jr. (born 1940), a Scientific and Technical Award (a Technical Oscar) in 2001:

... for the concept, design and engineering of the modern constant-directivity, direct radiator style motion picture loudspeaker systems. The work of John M. Eargle, D.B. 'Don' Keele and Mark E. Engebretson has resulted in the over 20-year dominance of constant-directivity, direct radiator bass style cinema loudspeaker systems.

== Career timeline ==
February 1977	Vice President Product Development, James B. Lansing Sound, Inc., Northridge, California

== Growing up ==
During his teenage years while at Texarkana High School in Arkansas, Eargle worked part-time for Paul Klipsch in Hope, Arkansas, which was about 30 miles from his home. Eargle graduated with honors from Texarkana Arkansas High School in 1948.

== Recordings ==
Eargle engineered more than 250 CD releases, many for Delos International, including the Seattle Symphony, the Dallas Symphony Orchestra, the London Symphony, the Helsinki Philharmonic, the Westminster Choir, the chamber orchestras of Los Angeles, New York, and Moscow, and the Los Angeles Guitar Quartet.

Eargle recorded soloists that include John Browning, Arleen Auger, Janos Starker, Garrick Ohlsson, Carol Rosenberger, and Bella Davidovich.

During the 43rd Grammy Awards (February 2001), Eargle won a Grammy for Best Engineered Album, Classical his Delos recording of Dvořák's Requiem and Symphony No. 9 performed by the New Jersey Symphony Orchestra – Zdenek Macal, conductor.

John Eargle was posthumously awarded a Technical GRAMMY Award in 2008 at the Special Merit Awards ceremony in Los Angeles on the evening prior to the 50th GRAMMY Awards Telecast. The Technical GRAMMY Award is presented by vote of The Recording Academy's National Trustees to individuals who have made contributions of outstanding technical significance to the recording field.

"John Eargle left an everlasting and profound impression on the audio industry," said Mark Gander, Vice President of Marketing, JBL Professional, who accepted the GRAMMY Award on behalf of John Eargle, along with John's niece, Cyndi Bird, and nephew and namesake, John Paul Eargle. "He was a brilliant engineer, musician, author and teacher. His 2008 Technical GRAMMY Award commemorates the industry-wide recognition of John's accomplishments, as well as the considerable time he devoted to sharing his expertise, experience and wisdom.

A jazz aficionado, Eargle engineered recordings by Joe Williams, Red Holloway, Ruth Brown, Clark Terry, Tommy Newsom, and Etta James. His recording of Joe Williams for Delos, titled Nothin' but the Blues won a Grammy in 1984 for Best Jazz Vocal Performance, Male, and his recording of Ruth Brown for Fantasy Records, Blues on Broadway, won a 1989 Grammy for Best Jazz Vocal Performance, Female.

== Education ==
Music

Eargle studied music at the University of North Texas College of Music (1948 to 1950), the Eastman School of Music (Bachelor of Music, 1953), and the University of Michigan (Master of Music, 1954).
His brother, Robert Gray Eargle, said that John Eargle had perfect pitch.

Scientific & engineering

After serving in the military, Eargle studied electrical engineering at the University of Texas at Austin (Bachelor of Science in Electrical Engineering 1962) and engineering at Cooper Union for the Advancement of Science and Art (Master of Engineering, 1970). His thesis at Cooper Union, under the direction of Professor Daniel M. Schutzer (born 1940), was titled Four-Channel Stereophonic Transmission Over Two Normal Audio Channels. He also studied acoustics with Cyril M. Harris (1917–2011) at Columbia University.

== Selected publications ==
Academic textbooks

- Handbook of Recording Engineering

Van Nostrand Reinhold, New York (©1986)
Second edition, John Wiley & Sons, New York (©1992)
Third edition, Van Nostrand Reinhold, New York (©1996)
Kluwer Academic Publishers, Boston (©2003)
Fourth edition, Springer Science+Business Media, New York City (©2005)

- The Microphone Book

Focal Press, Boston (©2001)
Second edition, Focal Press, Oxford, United Kingdom (©2004)

- Music, Sound, and Technology

Van Nostrand Reinhold, New York (©1990)
Second edition, Van Nostrand Reinhold, New York (©1995)

- Sound Recording

Van Nostrand Reinhold, New York (©1976)
Second edition, Van Nostrand Reinhold, New York (©1980)

- Electroacoustical Reference Data

Van Nostrand Reinhold, New York (©1994)

- Handbook of Sound System Design

ELAR Publishing Co., Inc., Commack, New York (©1989)

- Loudspeaker Handbook

First edition, Springer Press (©1997)
Second edition, Kluwer Academic Publishers, Boston (©2003)

Other publications

- Audio Engineering for Sound Reinforcement, coauthored with Chris Foreman (paperback), Hal Leonard, Milwaukee (©2002)
- The JBL Story: 60 Years of Audio Innovation, Hal Leonard, Milwaukee (©2006)
- JBL Sound System Design Reference Manual

Coauthored with George Lee Augspurger, published by JBL (©1982) (based largely on the Sound Workshop Manual, by George Lee Augspurger, born 1929, published by JBL, ©1977)
Second edition, coauthored with George Lee Augspurger, published by JBL (©1986)
Third edition, updated by John Eargle (©1999)

Academic papers

- Messiaen: His Style and Technique (masters thesis), University of Michigan (1954)

Other scientific publications

- Improvements in Monitor Loudspeaker Systems, coauthored with Don B. (Broadus) Keele, Jr. (born 1940), Journal of the Audio Engineering Society, Vol. 31, No. 6, June 1983

== Affiliations ==
- Eargle co-chaired with Tomlinson Holman the Audio Engineering Society Task Force on High Capacity Audio (Holman is the former Technical Director for Lucasfilm Limited where he pioneered the THX Sound System and Home THX; Holman named the most widely used multichannel sound system "5.1")
- 1974–1975 — President, Audio Engineering Society
- Fellow, Acoustical Society of America
- Senior member, Institute of Electrical and Electronics Engineers
- Member, Society of Motion Picture and Television Engineers
- Member, National Academy of Recording Arts and Sciences
- Member, Hollywood Sapphire Group (a social engineering society)
- Member, Tau Beta Pi (honorary engineering societies)
- Member, Eta Kappa Nu (honorary engineering societies)
- Member, Phi Mu Alpha, Gamma Theta, 1950 (University of North Texas College of Music Chapter)
