= Compression driver =

Type of loudspeaker

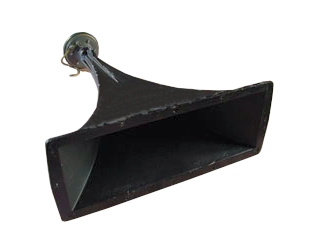
A compression driver (cylindrical box at rear) on a midrange horn loudspeaker used in a home audio system

A compression driver (A) in a horn loudspeaker consists of a metal diaphragm (blue) vibrated by the audio signal current in a coil of wire (red) between the poles of a cylindrical magnet (green). The sound waves pass out through an acoustic horn (B).

A compression driver is a small specialized diaphragm loudspeaker which generates the sound in a horn loudspeaker. It is attached to an acoustic horn, a widening duct which serves to radiate the sound efficiently into the air. It works in a "compression" mode; the area of the loudspeaker diaphragm is significantly larger than the throat aperture of the horn so that it provides high sound pressures. Horn-loaded compression drivers can achieve very high efficiencies, around 10 times the efficiency of direct-radiating cone loudspeakers. They are used as midrange and tweeter drivers in high-power sound reinforcement system loudspeakers, and in reflex or folded-horn loudspeakers in megaphones and public address systems.

== History ==
In 1924 C. R. Hanna and J. Slepian were the first to discuss the benefits of using a large radiating diaphragm with a horn of smaller throat area as a means of increasing the efficiency of horn loudspeaker drivers. They correctly surmised that this arrangement would result in a significant increase in the radiation resistance (and therefore increased efficiency), because the loading mismatch between the vibrating transducer surface and air is largely corrected, thus allowing for much better energy transfer. In the Hanna and Slepian proposal, the compression cavity is directly connected to the throat of the horn.

The next innovation came from E. C. Wente and A. L. Thuras in "A High-Efficiency Receiver for a Horn-Type Loudspeaker of Large Power capacity" in the Bell System Technical Journal, 1928. They devised a plug placed in front of a radiating diaphragm to control the transition from compression cavity to horn throat. They found that the bandwidth of the transducer could be extended to higher frequencies using their phase plug. They also outlined criteria for the design of the channels in the plug and suggested a path-length based design approach to maximize the bandwidth. Significantly, their plug moves the coupling point between the cavity and horn away from the axis of rotation. This change significantly improves the transducer response as the effect of the acoustical resonances in compression cavity is reduced. The paper described the first generation compression driver with a field coil magnet and phase plug, It used an aluminum diaphragm with an edge wound aluminum ribbon voice coil.

The first commercial compression driver was introduced 1933 when Bell Labs added a Western Electric No. 555 compression driver as a mid-range driver to their two-way "divided range" loudspeaker which was developed in 1931.

In 1953 Bob Smith made the most significant contribution to modern phase-plug, and hence compression driver design, with his paper published in the Journal of the Acoustical Society of America in which Smith analyzed the acoustical resonances occurring in the compression cavity and devised a design methodology to suppress the resonances by careful positioning and sizing of channels in the phase-plug. This work was largely ignored by his contemporaries and was only later popularized by Fancher Murray. Today the majority of compression drivers, either by inheritance or design, are based on the guidelines outlined by Smith.

The suppression technique of Smith has been recently extended using a more accurate analytical acoustical model of the compression driver geometry. From this work improved phase plug design guidelines have been deduced to eliminate all traces of acoustical resonance in the compression cavity. In this work Smith's derivation is confirmed using finite element analysis, a luxury that was unavailable to Smith.

== Compression driver protection ==
In some sound reinforcement and studio monitors the high frequency drivers are protected from damage by current sensing self-resetting circuit breakers. When too much power is dissipated by the driver, the circuit breaker interrupts the flow of electric current. The circuit breaker resets itself after a brief interval. An older circuit protection technique used by Electro-Voice, Community, UREI, Cerwin Vega and others is a light bulb placed in series with the driver to act as a variable resistor. The resistance of the bulb filament is proportional to its temperature which increases as current flow through the filament increases. The net effect is that as the power increases the filament consumes an increasing share of the total power thus limiting the power available to the compression driver.
