= D. B. Keele Jr. =

American audio engineer

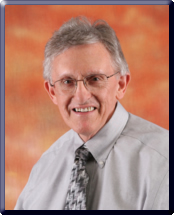
D. B. (Don) Keele Jr.

D. Broadus Keele Jr., also known simply as Don Keele or D. B. Keele Jr., is an American audio engineer and inventor who has helped shape and influence the professional and consumer loudspeaker industries since the early seventies. He is one of the developers of the constant directivity horn design with several patents of Bi-radial horns from companies like JBL, and Electrovoice.

Keele is a Fellow of the Audio Engineering Society and has published more than forty technical papers on subjects including speaker boxes, speaker horns, electrical circuits, computer and calculator aided design, anechoic chambers, interaural crosstalk, and Constant Beamwidth Transducers (CBT loudspeakers). Keele has won several awards including an Academy Award for Technical Achievement for his contribution to Constant Directivity loudspeaker systems in the cinema. In 2020, Keele was inducted in the TEC Awards' TECnology Hall of Fame.

== Awards and Recognitions ==
=== Audio Engineering Society ===
1975 Publications Award

1979 Fellowship

2016 Gold Medal Award (formerly The John H. Potts Memorial Award)

=== TEF/Goldline ===
2001 Richard C. Heyser TEF Award

=== Association of Loudspeaker Manufacturing and Acoustics (ALMA) ===
2011 The Beryllium Driver Award for Lifetime Achievement
