= Yorkville Sound =

Canadian audio equipment manufacturer

Yorkville Sound

Yorkville Sound is a Canadian manufacturer of audio amplifiers (including the Traynor amplifier line), loudspeakers and related professional sound reinforcement equipment. Based in Pickering, Ontario, Canada, the firm has a global presence as an importer and exporter of audio electronic products.

Yorkville manages its original Traynor brand, its own Yorkville brand and has expanded to include other brands such as Apex, ART (Applied Research and Technology), Orion FX Lights, Granite Percussion and Denver guitars. Yorkville provides North American distribution for KRK studio monitor speakers, Dynaudio studio monitor speakers, Epiphone guitars, Gibson guitars, Steinberger guitars, Gold Tone guitars, Ernie Ball and Rotosound guitar strings, Ritter bags, Samson audio products, HK Audio products, X-Vive Wireless products, Aston microphones and Gallien-Krueger amplifiers.

== History ==
Yorkville Sound began in 1963 in the back room of Long & McQuade, a music store on Yonge Street in Toronto. Peter Traynor was working as the business's repairman and had been customizing amplifiers by using readily available components. Traynor developed a rugged bass amplifier that was more resistant to the rigors of the road and began renting this new 'Dynabass' amp to customers.

By the end of 1963, Traynor began selling his Dynabass amps along with matching 15-inch speaker cabinets, as well as public address (PA) speakers based on a reference book of 1930s RCA commercial loudspeaker designs. Traynor approached Jack Long, co-founder of the music store, with the idea of starting Yorkville Sound to sell Traynor-branded bass amplifiers and more. Long and Traynor partnered in the venture, with Long owning two-thirds and Traynor one-third.

Original Traynor logo; Yorkville Sound's first brand

The line of products was sold with Traynor logos on the front and rear nameplates reading "mfg. by Yorkville Sound."

In 1965, Yorkville Sound incorporated as "Yorkville Sound Limited" with Long as President and Traynor as Vice-President. The operation moved to Dundas Street near Parliament in Toronto. In 1966, more products were introduced including the YVM-1 "Voice Master", a portable 45 watt tube amplifier combined with a four-channel microphone mixer. The Voice Master contained 1/4-inch phone jacks for PA speakers, a master volume control, treble, mid-range and bass tone controls and patching points for the TR-1, a spring reverb unit made by Traynor. The portable mixer-amplifier concept was a novel idea that quickly proved popular among musicians, and was the inspiration for the 1967 introduction of the competing "Vocal Master" product line by Shure.

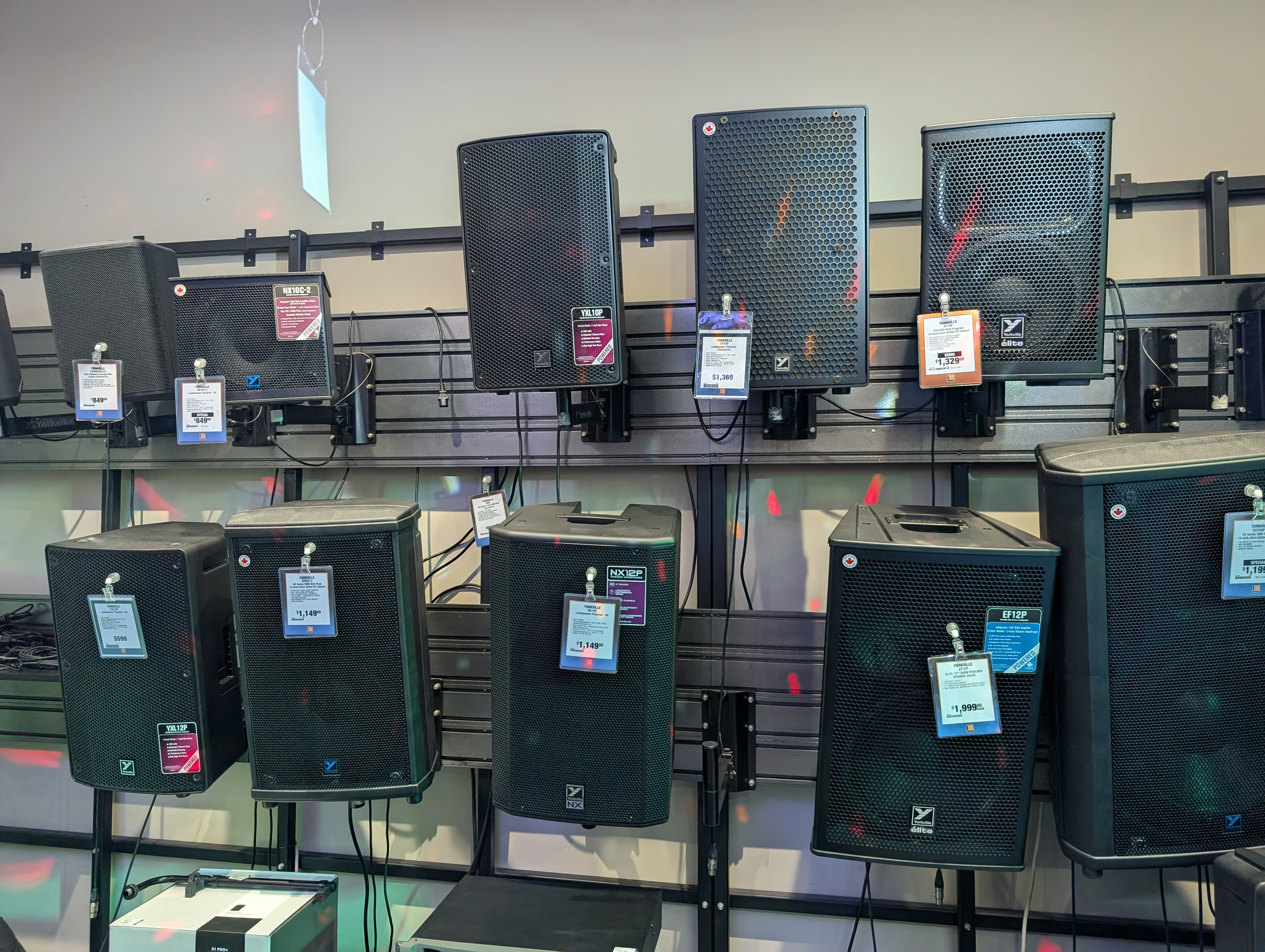
A display of current Yorkville products in a Long & McQuade music store.

In 1967, Yorkville expanded distribution westward to Vancouver and southward into the United States via Buffalo, New York. In 1969, Yorkville began designing larger concert equipment including eight-, sixteen- and 24-channel mixers with a pair of integral graphic equalizers, an audio snake and heavy folded-horn "W"-style bass bins loaded with 18-inch drivers. The sound contracting business also designed and used wedge-shaped monitor speakers on stage for artists to hear themselves. Concurrently, Yorkville incorporated their Buffalo operation to create a US-based business entity: Yorkville Sound Inc.

In 1970, the Canadian dollar ceased to be pegged to the American dollar and US dealers found their Yorkville prices suddenly jump 10% higher, followed quickly by another 10% added due to a short-lived US surtax on imported finished goods.

In 1972, Yorkville expanded operations to Europe, opening offices in the UK and Sweden. In 1976, Peter Traynor sold his shares and left Yorkville Sound. The Traynor brand would be slowly phased out over the next 17 years, until it was reintroduced in 2000. Steve Long, son of founder Jack Long, began working full-time at Yorkville Sound in 1981 and eventually became company president.

During the 1970s and 1980s, the company grew. Around 1981–1982, Yorkville Sound was contracted to fabricate loudspeaker enclosures for Martin Audio's North American market. In 1983, Yorkville Sound created their own "Sound Crew" line of concert speakers. In 1985, two new product lines appeared with the introduction of the "élite" series of portable loudspeakers with non-user adjustable 'black box' processing and the "Audiopro" line of electronic amplifiers. A thousand-watt subwoofer was brought out in 1986: the SW-1000.

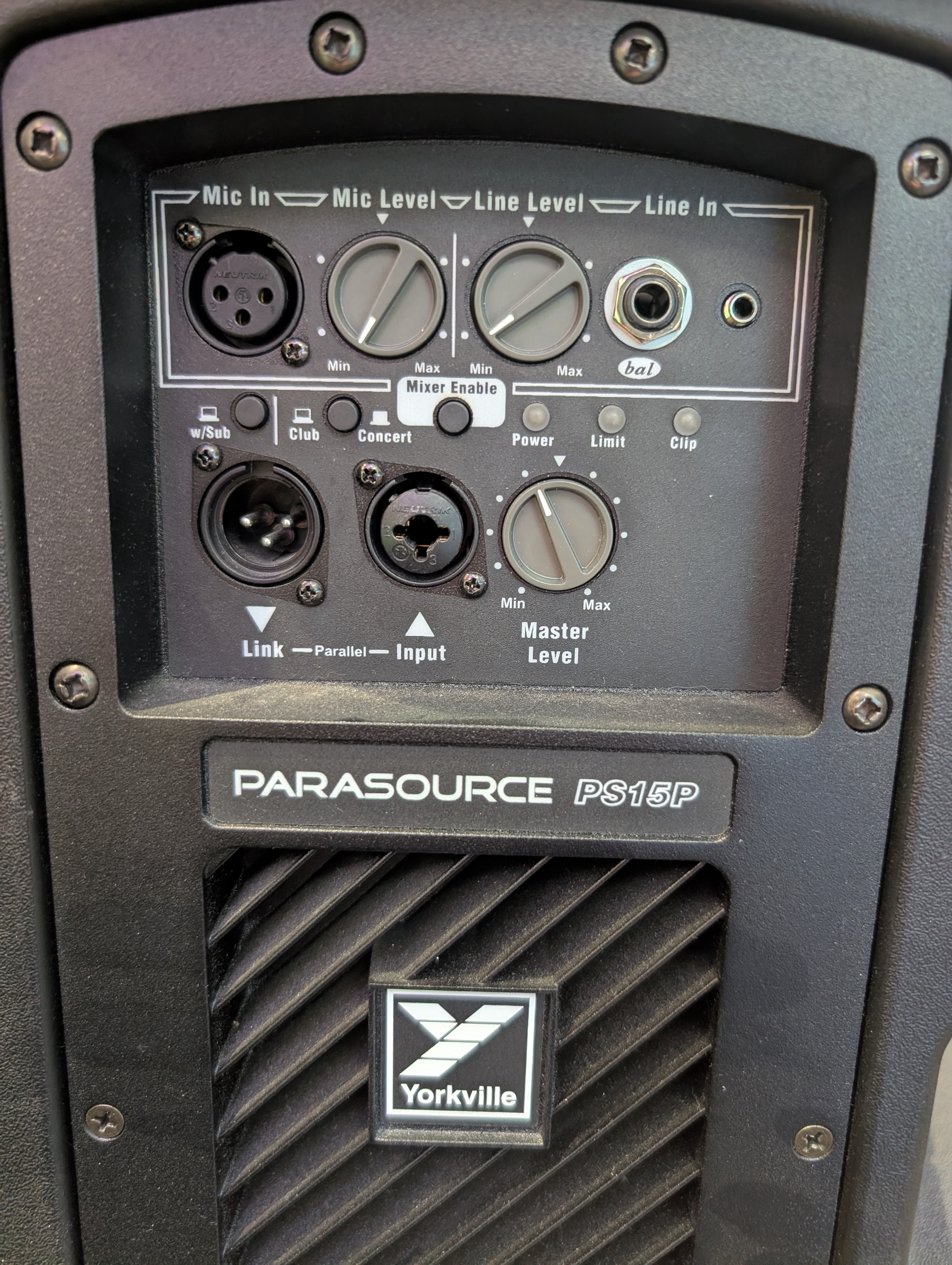
The control panel on a PS15P powered loudspeaker.

A line of studio monitor speakers was created in 1991. In 1996, Yorkville introduced the "TX" line of concert touring loudspeakers. In 2001, Yorkville contracted with designer Tom Danley to create the "Unity" line of loudspeakers which was introduced in 2003. The Unity design was licensed from Danley's company Sound Physics Labs.

Today, Yorkville manufacturers several lines of live sound products. The Paraline, Parasource and Synergy loudspeaker systems are intended for large venues and outdoor festivals, while their smaller NX, YXL and EXM series offer solutions for smaller venues, including portable battery-powered models. Yorkville also produces a variety of mixers, stage lights, cables and other accessories

In 2014, Jack Long received the Order of Canada for his contribution to the Canadian music industry, and in particular for founding both Long & McQuade and Yorkville Sound.In 2016, Pete Traynor died at the age of 77. In 2024, Jack died at the age of 95. Yorkville Sound continues to be owned by the Long family.

== See also ==
- Traynor Amplifiers
- Carvin Corporation
- Peavey Electronics
