= Hartke =

Hartke is a surname. Notable people with the surname include:

- Charles A. Hartke (1944–2025), American politician
- Gilbert V. Hartke (1907–1986), American drama teacher and activist
- Stephen Hartke (born 1952), American classical composer
- Vance Hartke (1919–2003), American politician

== Fictional characters ==
- Eugene Debs Hartke, a character in the Kurt Vonnegut novel Hocus Pocus

== Other ==
- Hartke, bass amplifier and loudspeaker cabinet equipment company
