= Traynor Amplifiers =

Canadian amplifier manufacturer

Traynor
- Industry: Musical instrument amplification
- Founded: 1963 in Toronto, Ontario, Canada
- Founder: Peter Traynor
- Headquarters: Pickering, Ontario, Canada
- Products: Amplifiers, speaker cabinets
- Owner: Yorkville Sound
- Website: https://traynoramps.com/

Traynor is a brand of bass amplifiers and guitar amplifiers, the first brand formed by Yorkville Sound. The Traynor brand, named for founder Peter Traynor, began in 1963 with the Dynabass bass amplifier, a rental product. Traynor first became popular in Canada by providing less expensive versions of the circuits used in Marshall and Fender amplifiers of the time. The revived brand now produces a wide range of electric, acoustic, and bass guitar amps.

== History ==
In 1963, Traynor amps were designed by Peter Traynor, a music shop repairman who had been customizing amplifiers as a way to save costs for the business. Through experimentation and experience, Traynor developed a bass guitar amplifier that he called the Traynor Dynabass. By the end of 1963, Traynor was selling the Dynabass amps along with matching 15-inch speaker cabinets, as well as Traynor portable columnar public address (PA) speakers based on a reference book of 1930s RCA commercial loudspeaker designs. Soon a business partnership to sell these amps had formed between Traynor and Jack Long, the man who owned the music store that Traynor worked at. The company was named Yorkville Sound.

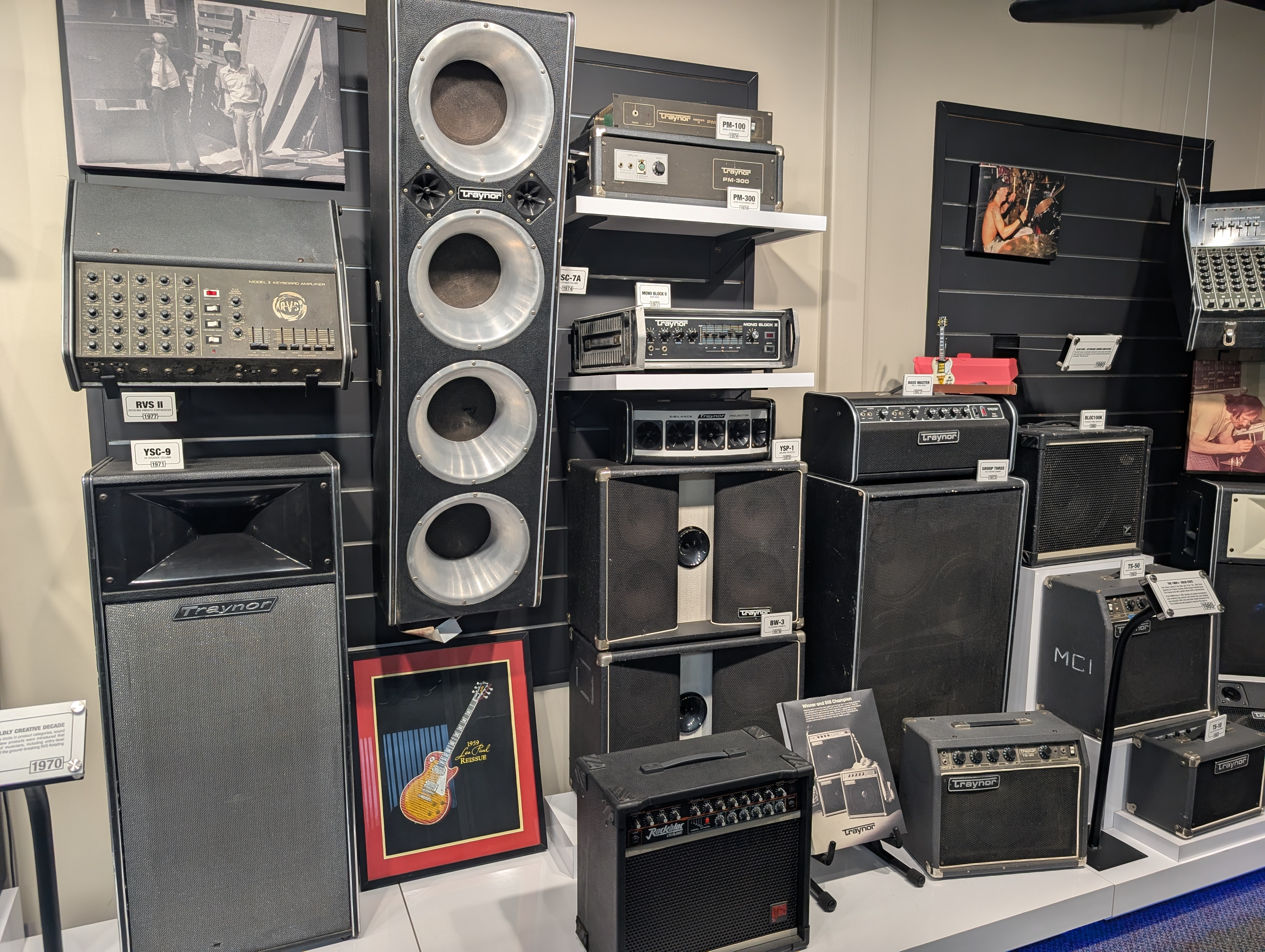
Photo from the Yorkville factory museum in Pickering Ontario.

In 1964, the Dynabass became the "Bass Master", model "YBA-1", and its associated 15-inch speaker cabinet became the "YS-15". The YBA-1 "Bass Master" circuit is very similar to the Fender Bassman, which in turn inspired the classic Marshall 1959 "Plexi" amplifier. The column loudspeakers were designated "YSC-1" and two additional models were created: the "YSC-2" with fewer, larger drivers to obtain more low-frequency bass extension and the "YSC-3" which was a cut-down version of the YSC-1 for customers who needed a smaller loudspeaker.

Starting in 1965 with the Traynor Hi-Tone, a 2x12 test guitar amp (of which only two were ever made), Pete Traynor began experimenting with guitar amp designs. The YGA-1 (a 45 watt amp head) and the YGM-1 (a 1x12 20 watt tube combo) were the first products of this research. Full production of these amps began in 1966, and the release of new models continued until the 70s.

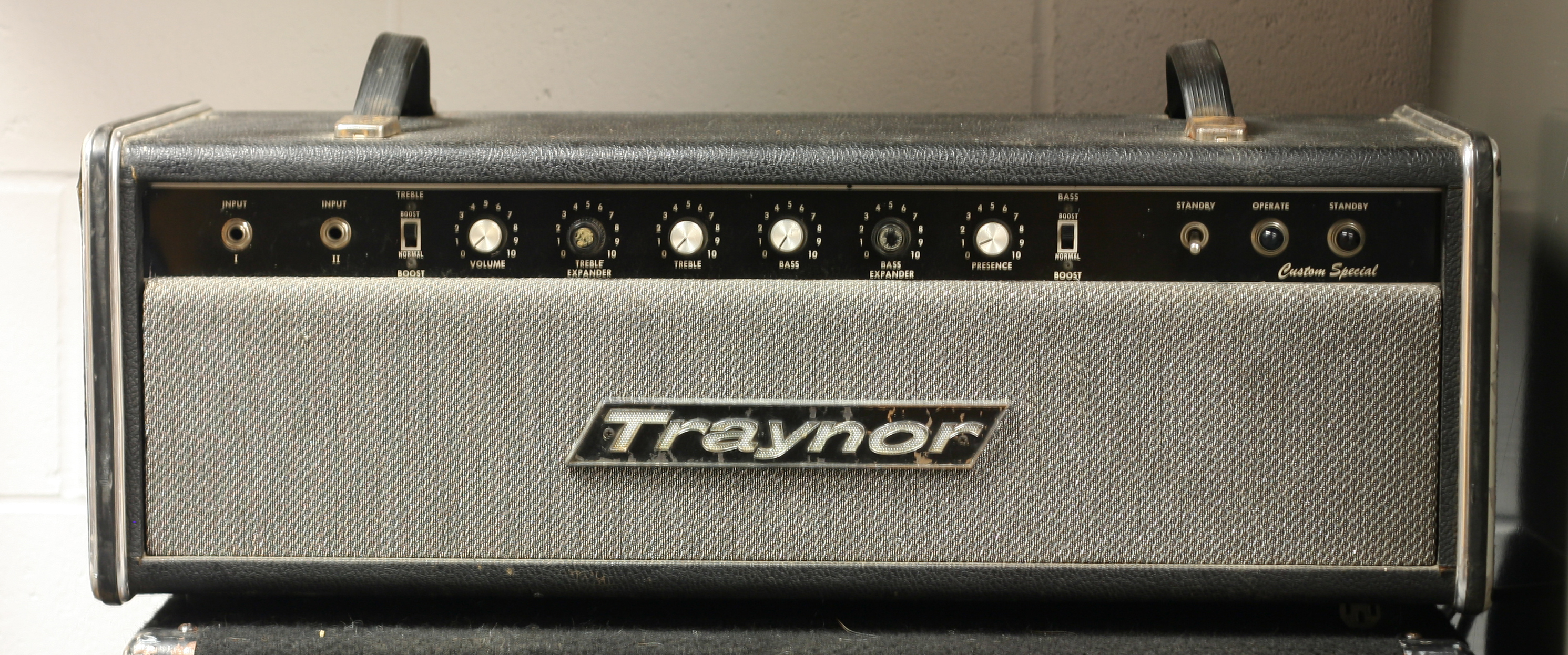
Traynor YBA-3 Custom Special Amp showing the 1970 parallelogram nameplate

In 1970, Traynor introduced the new Traynor logo (in the shape of a parallelogram) that was less prone to having the initial 'T' and final 'r' break off to become "rayno". In 1976, Peter Traynor left Yorkville Sound, suffering from a bad back. The Traynor brand would be slowly phased out over the next 17 years until its reintroduction in 2000.

As of 2011, Traynor products are manufactured in Pickering, Ontario.

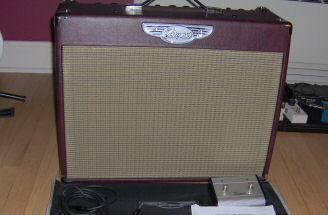
Traynor YCV40WR Amp

In 2000, Yorkville Sound reintroduced the Traynor brand with the YCV40 (Custom Valve) model. The brand has a wide product range, including DynaGain solid state guitar amplifiers, International amplifiers, Bass Master bass amplifiers, keyboard amplifiers, and an acoustic guitar amplifier line.
