= Enhanced Acoustic Simulator for Engineers =

Engineering design and analysis software for optimizing acoustics

Enhanced Acoustic Simulator for Engineers (EASE) is an engineering design and analysis software for optimizing acoustics. The full product is licensed and copy protected. It can perform complex analysis in three-dimensional space. There is a free-to-use web-based version available for two-dimensional analysis with limited geometry options.

== See also ==
- Acoustical engineering
