= Renkus-Heinz =

American sound equipment manufacturer

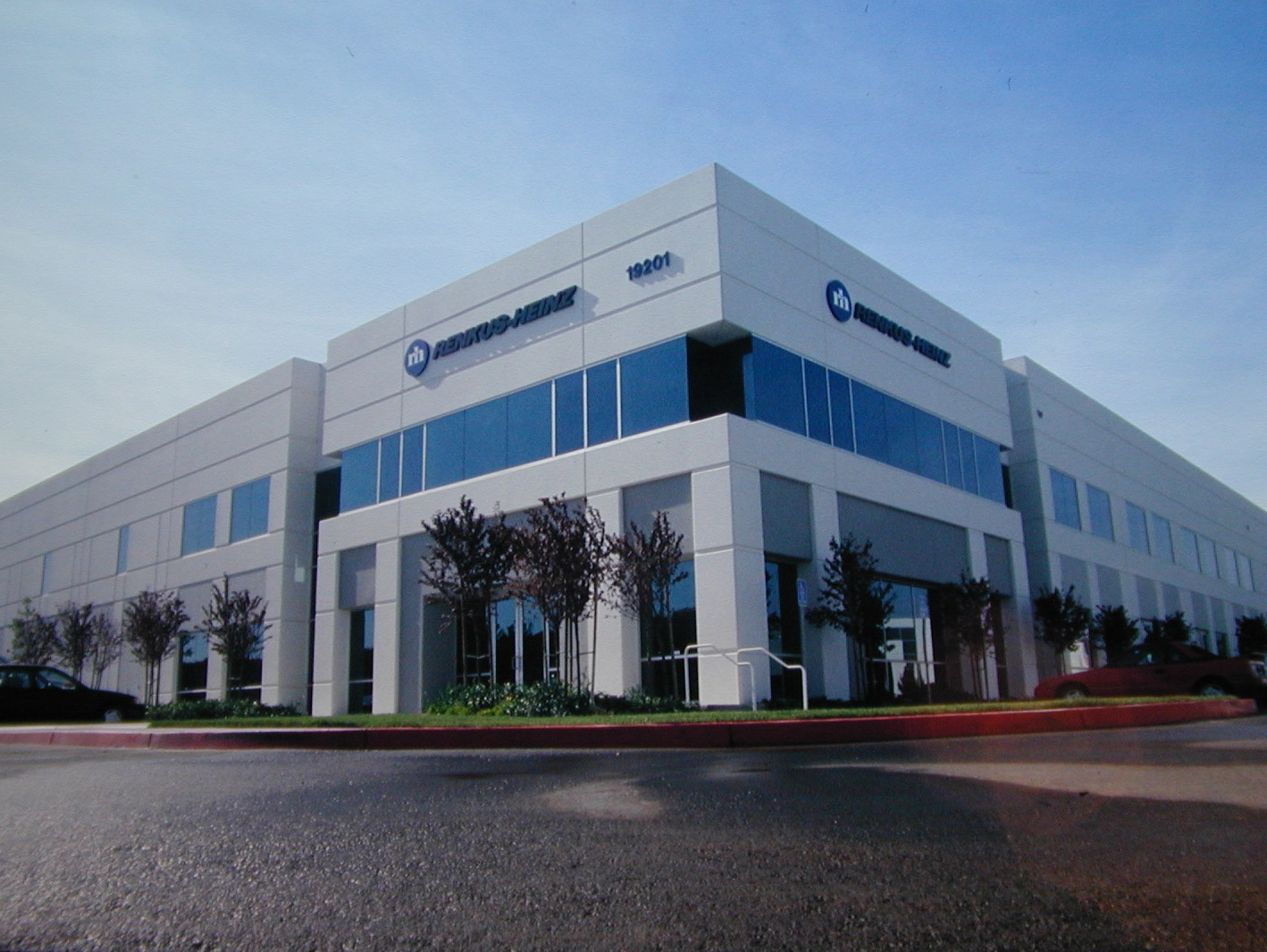
- Headquarters in Foothill Ranch, California
- Industry: Audio electronics
- Founded: 1979
- Founders: Harro K. Heinz, Algis Renkus
- Headquarters: Foothill Ranch, California, United States
- Key people: President Harro K. Heinz, CEO
- Products: Loudspeakers
- Website: renkus-heinz.com

Renkus-Heinz is a California-based manufacturer of loudspeakers and related professional sound reinforcement equipment specializing in steerable loudspeaker technology. Founded in 1979, the company is based in Foothill Ranch, California.

== History ==
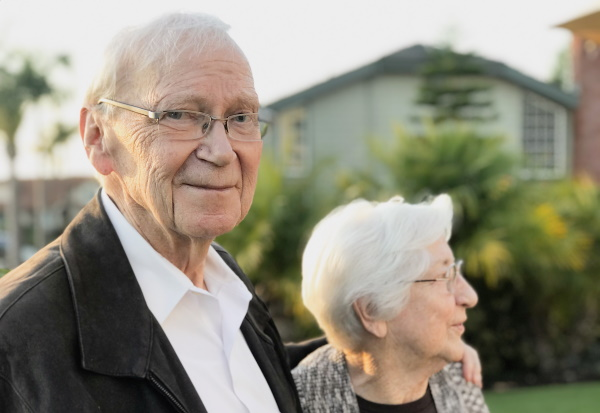
Renkus-Heinz Founder and CEO Harro Heinz

Renkus-Heinz was founded in 1979 by Harro K. Heinz and Algis Renkus. Heinz had previously been awarded a patent in 1975 for his work on a "Comprehensive feedback elimination system employing notch filter" that was performed while he was employed at Rauland Borg Corporation, the company he left to found Renkus-Heinz. Algis Renkus was joined in the new enterprise by his father Jonas A. Renkus (b. 1912) who had worked at Altec under industry veteran John Kenneth Hilliard.

While at Renkus-Heinz, Jonas Renkus patented a new triple lamination construction method in 1980. In 1981, the two Renkus men left Renkus-Heinz to assist Emilar, which was having trouble staying in business. Harro Heinz remained president of Renkus-Heinz.

While Jonas and Algis Renkus were at Emilar, they began using the patented triple lamination method which had been assigned to Renkus-Heinz. Heinz sued for damages but dropped the case during the hearing.

In 1989 Harro's son Ralph D. Heinz joined Renkus-Heinz to work with Don B. Keele, Jr. and Gene Patronis and further his knowledge of electro-acoustics and horn loudspeaker design. Ralph Heinz eventually became senior vice-president of R&D and patented a method of arraying loudspeakers for better phase coherency in 1994. In 1996, he patented a multiple driver horn which was promoted as the "CoEntrant" transducer, covering both mid- and high-frequency bands in one horn. In 2016, Ralph Heinz was named Chief Technical Officer.

In 1999, Harro's daughter Monika Heinz Smetona joined Renkus-Heinz on the administrative team and was named chief operating officer in 2016. She was then named chief financial officer in 2019.

In May 2019, Matt Czyzewski joined Renkus-Heinz as president. Czyzewski has since moved on to AtlasIED.

== Awards ==
- Rental & Staging Systems Best of Show Award for the ICLive X series
- rAVe [Pubs] The Best of ISE 2019 Award for the DC12/2

== See also ==
- JBL (company)
- Meyer Sound Laboratories
- QSC Audio Products
