= Community Professional Loudspeakers =

Community Professional Loudspeakers is an American manufacturer of loudspeakers and sound reinforcement equipment. The company has been located in the Philadelphia area since its inception in 1968, and has occupied its present location in Chester, Pennsylvania since 1981.

A majority share of Community was acquired by Audioprof Group International (AGI) of Antwerp, Belgium, in October 2015. AGI already owned Apart Audio of Belgium. Both Community and Apart Audio were acquired in July 2019 by Biamp of Beaverton, Oregon.

== Background ==
Bruce Howze founded the company in 1968, which was first named Community Light and Sound. The company originally started in the Philadelphia area, and now occupies a 100,000 square foot space in Chester, Pennsylvania.

Community established itself as the first company to utilize fiberglass to create large yet lightweight loudspeaker horns and enclosures. In 1970, it introduced its first notable live sound reinforcement loudspeaker product, the LMF, a fiberglass midrange horn. The company next developed the Leviathan fiberglass composite bass horn, which Elvis Presley used in his 1971 tour. Several top musical groups from that era used Leviathans as well, such as the Eagles, Linda Ronstadt, and Earth, Wind & Fire.

In the mid-1970s, Community became one of the first companies to meticulously test and document the performance of both its own loudspeakers and competitors’ loudspeakers. Community based its test measurement philosophy on the underlying principles of “free field” and “far field,” believing that far more dependable and relevant data can be obtained by testing loudspeakers at measurement distances that correspond to actual listening distances.

Since its founding, Community has pursued pioneering loudspeaker technologies. In 2010, the United States Patent and Trademark Office granted the company a patent for Carbon Ring Cone Technology.

Steve Johnson joined Community in 2013 as president. In 2015, Community was acquired by Audioprof Group International of Belgium, which also owns Apart Audio. Howze continued with Community. The brand has a global presence with its products being for live performance and permanent installation in houses of worship, schools, and other venues.

Community Professional is also well known for its weather-resistant loudspeaker designs, which are installed in major sports stadia and arenas throughout the world. This same quality makes the company's loudspeakers a valuable component in emergency notification systems, such as the one used by the Tidal Information System in Venice, Italy.
