= Gallien-Krueger =

American audio equipment manufacturer

- Type: Private
- Industry: Amplification
- Founded: San Jose, California, U.S. (1968; 58 years ago)
- Founder: Robert Gallien and Richard Krueger
- Headquarters: Stockton, California, U.S.
- Key people: Robert Gallien
- Products: Amplifiers
- Website: gallien-krueger.com

Gallien-Krueger, also referred to as 'GK' (as in their logo), is a manufacturer of bass amplifiers and speaker cabinets. The company is based in Stockton, California, and was founded in 1968.

== History ==
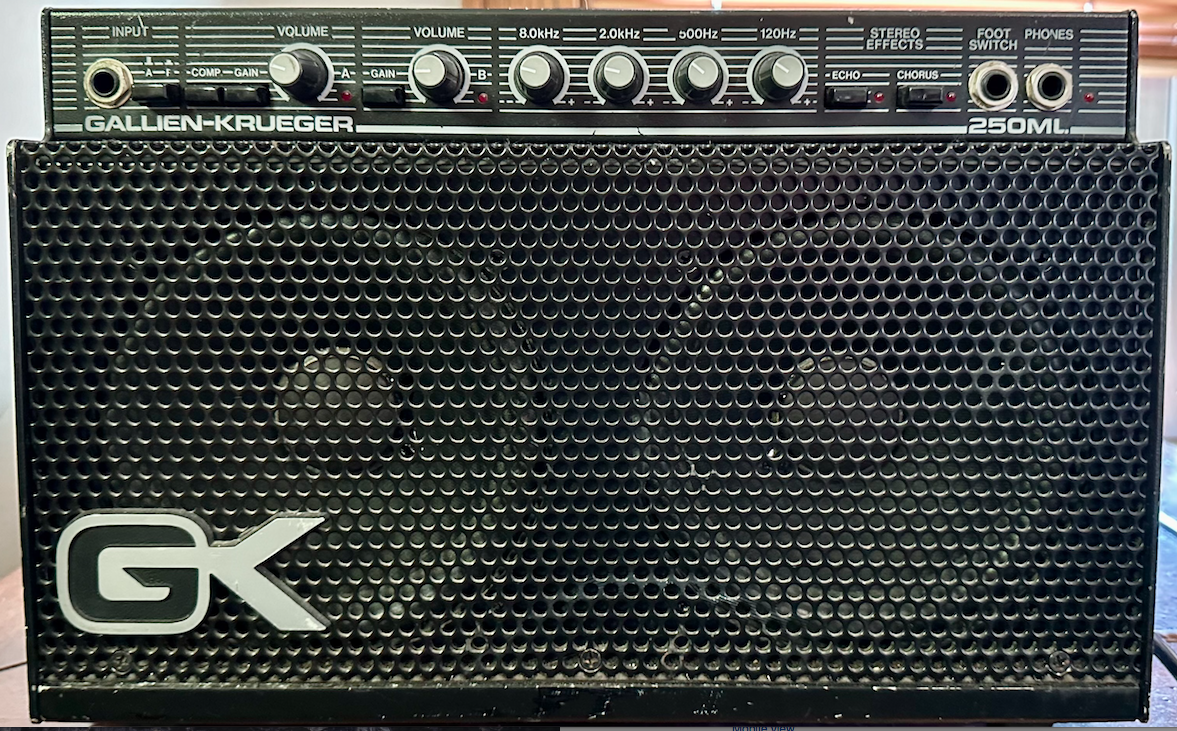
Gallien-Krueger 250ML

Robert Gallien started his company, then named GMT, from his garage in 1968 in San Jose, California, while working as an engineer for Hewlett-Packard. His first amps were the GMT 226A and 226B (named after their power output) and were unconventional in their design because they were built around transistors instead of tubes. Carlos Santana was one of the first to buy a GMT 226A (serial #6).

In the early 1970s, Bob Gallien teamed up with fellow HP engineer Rich Krueger and the company was renamed from GMT (Gallien-Martin-Taylor) to Gallien-Krueger. Although Rich Krueger is no longer involved in the company it has retained his name. In 1983, Gallien-Krueger launched the bass amplifier that would define the future of the company, the 800RB. The GK sound is defined by a dry "growl" and a quick reaction from the class H power amplifier. GK engineered the 200MB, which was the smallest and lightest 200W bass amp available when it launched, and the 250BL, the first channel-switching bass amp.

The company stopped producing electric guitar amplifiers in the early 1990s but continues to make bass amplifiers and bass cabinets. In November 2013, the company paid a fine to the FCC for producing non-compliant digital radio products. Gallien-Krueger produces a lineup of lightweight Class D amplifiers and Neodymium (Neo IV) bass speaker cabinets.

Artists using GK equipment include Flea of the Red Hot Chili Peppers, Velvet Revolver's Duff McKagan, Tom Hamilton of Aerosmith, and Ted Dwane of Mumford & Sons. Pink Floyd's David Gilmour used a Gallien-Krueger when recording the songs Sorrow and Learning to Fly.
