= Tom Danley =

American engineer & inventor

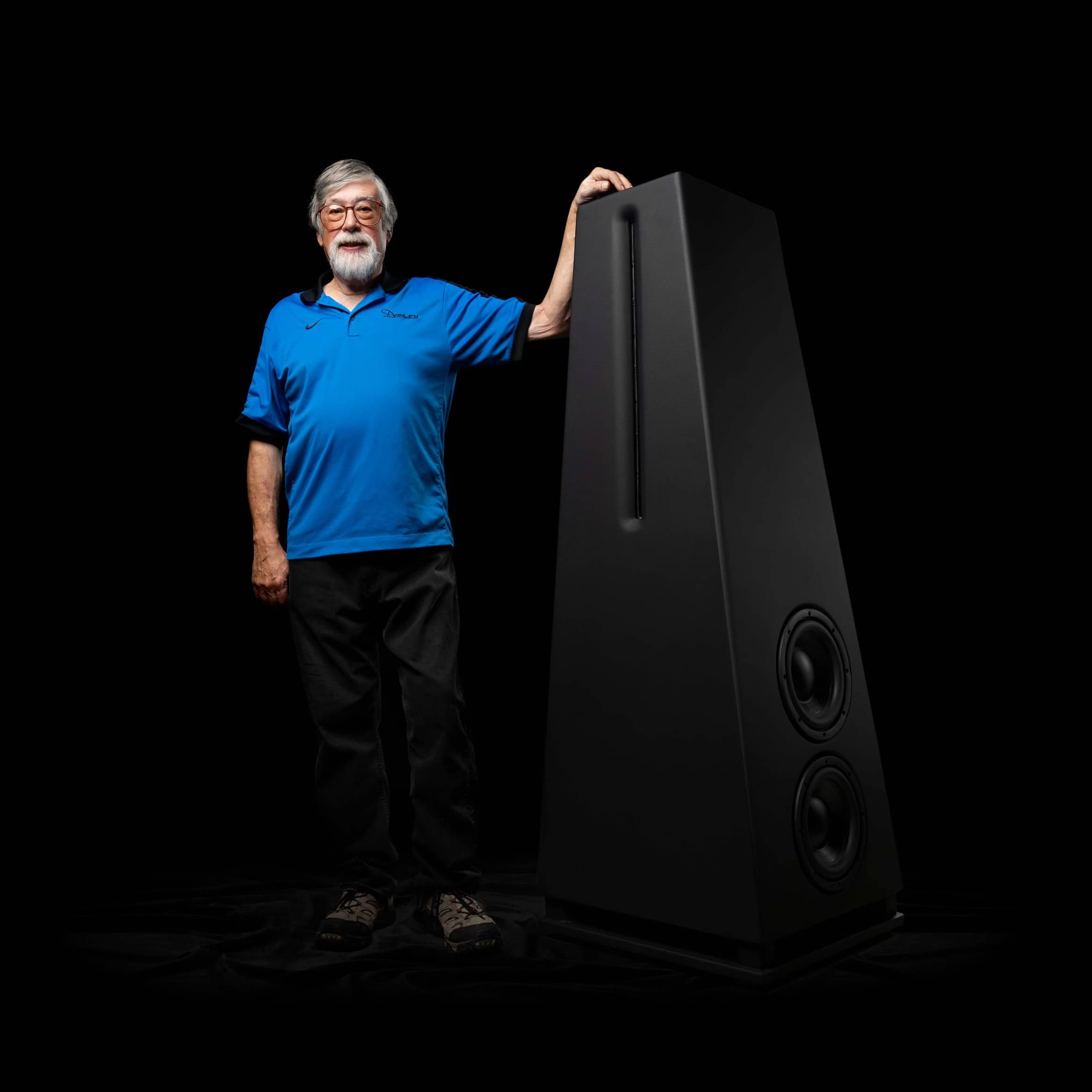
- Born: July 16, 1952 (age 73)
- Occupations: Audio engineer, electrical engineer and inventor
- Employer(s): Intersonics, Danley Sound Labs
- Children: 2
- Website: http://danleysoundlabs.com

Thomas J. Danley (born 1952) is an American audio engineer, electrical engineer and inventor, the holder of multiple patents for audio transducers, especially high-linearity, high-output professional horn loudspeaker systems. Danley first gained notice in the 1980s with his novel servomotor-driven subwoofer systems used to reproduce very low frequencies in concert tours and theme parks. In 2000 he advanced the implementation of multiple-entry horns in 2000 with several designs led by the SPL-td1, a seven-driver loudspeaker. In 2005, he started a new company, Danley Sound Labs, through which he patented further technologies and produced a wide variety of loudspeaker models based on these technologies.

== Early life and career ==
Danley was raised in the northern area of Illinois, around Highland Park, north of Chicago. His father and brother were mechanically inclined, and taught Danley how to use the workshop tools. Danley studied mechanisms by taking them apart, and he learned to arc weld by age 12. He attended Deerfield High School, obtaining his diploma in five years instead of four. He later said, "I took every shop class there was, but I had an attendance problem and math was my weakest thing." One of his friends from mechanical drawing class was T.C. Furlong, who later became an equipment manufacturer and event production company owner.

During and after high school, Danley worked as an electronic technician, and he played bass guitar in several bands. He fabricated his own tube amplifiers. After a few years, he joined Steamer Sound, the audio production company founded in 1973 by Furlong. Danley designed loudspeakers for the company, and for individual musicians such as keyboardist Joan Gand. In 1974, he brought a reel-to-reel tape recorder to the Alley, a nightclub in Highwood owned by Furlong, to record the performance of the John Burns Band (the son of Jethro Burns) as he mixed their set. Danley was amazed when he listened to the tape after the show; the tape held a wider frequency range, a higher fidelity experience than was heard at the nightclub. He realized that the loudspeakers must have been a significant limiting factor.

Danley left Steamer Sound to work as an electronics technician at Data Specialties in Northbrook, where in 1976 he first used a computer, a VIC-20, to write a program to perform the math calculations he needed at work. He was repairing teleprinters and punch card readers, and had almost given up on concert audio in his career.

== Intersonics ==
In 1979, a co-worker recommended a job offering nearby at Intersonics, a contractor to NASA, supplying hardware for rocketry research. Danley invented many devices while at Intersonics, obtaining 17 patents. The inventions include a high-powered acoustic levitator, a sonic-boom generator used by BBN Technologies, and a multi-enclosure Flow Modulator loudspeaker system used by Georgia Tech Research Institute and NASA for vibration tests on rocket payloads. Danley designed and built major components of the payload on Space Shuttle flights STS-7 in 1983 and STS-51-A in 1984.

=== ServoDrive ===
Danley experimented on his own with a loudspeaker based on the servomotor, and showed the third prototype to his employer. When he asked permission to use this technology to create a subwoofer product line for concerts and touring sound systems, Intersonics president Roy Whymark said yes, but only if the effort did not interfere with Danley's other responsibilities at Intersonics. Danley designed a variety of models including W bins, seeing the most success with the folded horn BassTech 7 subwoofer which performed very well. ServoDrive became the professional audio division of Intersonics.

The BassTech 7 was used to great acclaim by Clair Brothers on the North American legs of Michael Jackson's Thriller tour and U2's the Unforgettable Fire tour, both in 1984. Clair typically used a dozen Danley subwoofers as the lowest element of a 5-way system, to fill the bottom octave. Other large purchasers of the BassTech 7 included Disney with about 500 units in Europe and the U.S., and in Las Vegas, the hotels Mirage and Treasure Island which used the BassTech 7 for special effects. The BassTech 7 drive unit was essentially a cube holding two opposing 15-inch woofers, both connected to a central servo motor by way of shafts and flexible belts. The enclosure included Danley's patented cooling fan powered by a DC-rectified portion of the audio signal, kicking in only at high voltage levels. The servo motors in the subwoofer allowed for 3 to 4 times as much peak-to-peak deflection of the woofer cones, compared to what was available at the time with conventional magnetic coil woofers. Additionally, the servo design greatly reduced the common problem of power compression, in which a driver heats up and sound output drops. The servo motor can change direction very quickly, easily allowing an upper frequency response of 125 Hz down to 28 Hz with less than 2% harmonic distortion. Trouble arose with the belt material, which was modified several times by the supplier without notice, resulting in driver failures.

Both Intersonics and the ServoDrive division grew in the mid-1980s. A turning point was the Space Shuttle Challenger disaster in 1986, which damped the mood and the business climate in the aerospace industry, and brought delays and cancellations of contracts.

Around 1986 a request came in to Intersonics from Cornell University for a low frequency subwoofer loudspeaker intended to reproduce elephant vocalizations in Kenya. Dr. Joyce Poole and Katy Payne of the Amboseli Elephant Research Project asked for a custom loudspeaker that would fit inside a sport utility vehicle, and provide strong output down to 14 Hz. Danley designed the Pachyderm 6, an enclosure with two 15-inch drivers connected to a servo motor, and four 18-inch passive radiators. The output at 14 Hz was measured at about 115 dB with about 200 watts from the amplifier.

Based on this, another subwoofer model produced by ServoDrive was the Contrabass in 1987, similar to the Pachyderm 6 but with a smaller enclosure and half the number of passive radiators. The frequency response also reached down to 14 Hz. The Contrabass was popular for home theater installations, including George Lucas' home. An unusual characteristic of the Contrabass was that its distortion components went down as sound pressure level went up, until 105 decibels was reached.

== Sound Physics Labs ==
Intersonics determined to close the ServoDrive division, as it was considered a distraction from aerospace work. To save the firm, Danley teamed with Bradford Skuran, a guitarist he had played with in his youth, to form a new company: Sound Physics Labs (SPL). SPL bought ServoDrive and continued to produce and service the subwoofers, as well as to design new loudspeakers.

=== Multiple entry horns ===
In the late 1990s, Danley designed the SPL-td1, his first trapezoidal "top box" intended to deliver the mid- and high frequency sounds to complement a subwoofer. The SPL-td1, produced in 2000, was a 3-way speaker which used seven drivers exiting into the same horn to deliver greater coherence. The SPL-td1 was used in many installations and concerts, including the opening and closing ceremonies of the 2002 Winter Olympics in Salt Lake City. Danley's 3-way design was an improvement on the 2-way CoEntrant patent by Ralph Heinz in 1996. In 2001, Danley began developing the "Unity" horn for license to Yorkville Sound, patenting the improvement in 2002. In 2003, Yorkville released their Unity line of loudspeakers, using Danley's Unity horn design for the mid-range and high frequency bandpasses.

Further modifications to the SPL-td1 concept came with the SPL-td2 providing improved phase/time linearity, the smaller and lighter SPL-runt, and the larger SPL-trik containing nine drivers.

== LAB subwoofer ==
In the early 2000s, Danley was participating in online discussions at Dave Stevens' Live Audio Board (LAB), a bulletin board system which was later hosted by ProSoundWeb. A number of LAB users wished to collaborate on a do-it-yourself (DIY) subwoofer design. Danley discussed the benefits and tradeoffs of horn versus front-loaded subwoofers, and offered to model a horn enclosure based on the desired size, frequency response and power handling. He "spearheaded" the effort which in February 2002 resulted in Danley posting the design of a 45 in × 45 in × 22.5 in (114 cm × 114 cm × 57.1 cm) snail-shell folded-horn subwoofer using two 12-inch drivers at the horn throat. (This was the exact same enclosure size as the BassTech 7, with similarities in the internal folding of the horn.) Eminence, an American speaker company who was also participating in the discussions, designed a custom 12-inch driver to meet the requirements: the LAB12. The LAB Sub, also called the LAB horn, was a heavy subwoofer optimized for operation as four enclosures strapped together in a 2×2 "cube" configuration, to increase the effective mouth size and achieve a low frequency of 32 Hz. Danley's conceptual design (he never built one) was given freely to the public domain, and proved to be influential as the first DIY folded horn subwoofer.

== Danley Sound Labs ==
Danley partnered with entrepreneur Mike Hedden in 2005 to form Danley Sound Labs (DSL), a loudspeaker company based in Gainesville, Georgia, near Atlanta. Previously, Hedden had been the owner of dB Audio & Video, an A/V contractor who was the largest distributor of SPL loudspeakers. For the first ten years of DSL, Danley contributed design ideas while continuing to live in Illinois. In 2015, he moved to Georgia. The first product was the SH100, an 8-inch coaxial loudspeaker intended for 300-seat churches.

=== Technologies ===
Danley's Synergy Horn concept was an improvement on the multiple entry design of the SPL-td1. The idea is that multiple drivers in different bandpasses are combined into one horn to make a phase-accurate, constant-directivity single-point-source loudspeaker.

Danley's Tapped Horn concept directs sound from the rear of a horn-loaded driver into ports (taps) that are vented into the horn closer to the mouth of the horn, farther from the driver at the throat of the horn. At frequences such that the wavelength is twice the distance to the taps, the waves routed inside the cabinet to exit through ports in the horn combine positively with direct sound from the front of the driver.

Following the SH100, the SH50 was introduced: a 3-way, seven-driver loudspeaker, launched in November 2005. It used both the Synergy Horn and the Tapped Horn technologies to deliver coherent sound down to 50 Hz with an output pattern of 50° × 50°.

Danley's Shaded Amplitude Lens technology, patented in 2009, uses vanes to deflect portions of the high frequency driver output so that the different paths produce an output pattern appropriate for large venues, such that the farther audience hears much the same amplitude and sound fidelity as the near audience. The vanes allow the upper output pattern of the horn to be narrower than the angle of the horn walls, to carry farther without dissipating. The lower parts of the horn allow the sound to spread wider for the near audience.

In 2011, Danley filed a patent for DSL's Paraline Technology, a method of combining the output of multiple high frequency drivers into a common output chamber or horn. The waves are routed through multiple passageways defined by parallel partitions of gradient sizes.

=== Matterhorn ===
In March 2007, DSL produced the Matterhorn, a single subwoofer made from an intermodal shipping container. Danley designed the Matterhorn to meet a military specification, to produce a low frequency sound in the range of 15 to 20 Hz, to be measured at 94 decibels at a distance of 250 meters. To accomplish this, Danley arranged forty 15-inch MTX subwoofer drivers in a tapped horn configuration, each driver powered by its own 1,000 watt amplifier. A diesel generator was included inside the container for operation in the field. The subwoofer has a flat frequency response from 15 to 80 Hz, and is down 3 dB at 12 Hz. The Matterhorn has been called the World's Biggest Subwoofer.

=== Jericho Horn ===
In 2010, DSL introduced the Jericho Horn, a loudspeaker intended for large audiences. The Jericho Horn is a 4-way design employing six 18-inch drivers for the lows, six 6-inch drivers for the low mids, and two mid-high frequency drivers each of which carries 2-way high frequencies. The Jericho Horn incorporates Danley's patented Shaded Amplitude Lens technology.

The Jericho Horn was praised in 2017 when four of the large enclosures were used for DJ sets at the Temple stage at Glastonbury Festival, along with 22 boxes of DSL TH-118 subwoofers. The Jericho Horns and subwoofers were installed and operated by Neuron Pro Audio. After hearing the sound system, festival co-founder Michael Eavis chose the Temple stage for his welcome speech rather than the main stage.

== Audio consultant ==
Danley has consulted on acoustic issues for various projects. He appeared in the 1993 documentary The Mystery of the Sphinx to demonstrate acoustic levitation. Danley was an early adopter of the Crown Tecron TEF (time-energy-frequency) audio analysis system, introduced in 1983, and he used a TEF-10 portable test rig to measure his audio experiments. At the request of the same documentary producer, in the 1990s Danley used a TEF-12 analyzer to assess the acoustics inside the Great Pyramid of Giza.

In 2019 Danley was recognized as an audio industry pioneer by AVIXA, the Audiovisual and Integrated Experience Association. Danley received the Adele De Berri Pioneers of AV Award. The award was presented on June 12 at the InfoComm convention held in Orlando, Florida.

== Personal life ==
Danley has played bass guitar since high school. He was in several bands in the 1970s.

When his marriage dissolved in the late 1980s, Danley raised his two daughters as a single father.
