= Ampeg Portaflex =

Line of electric guitar and bass amplifiers

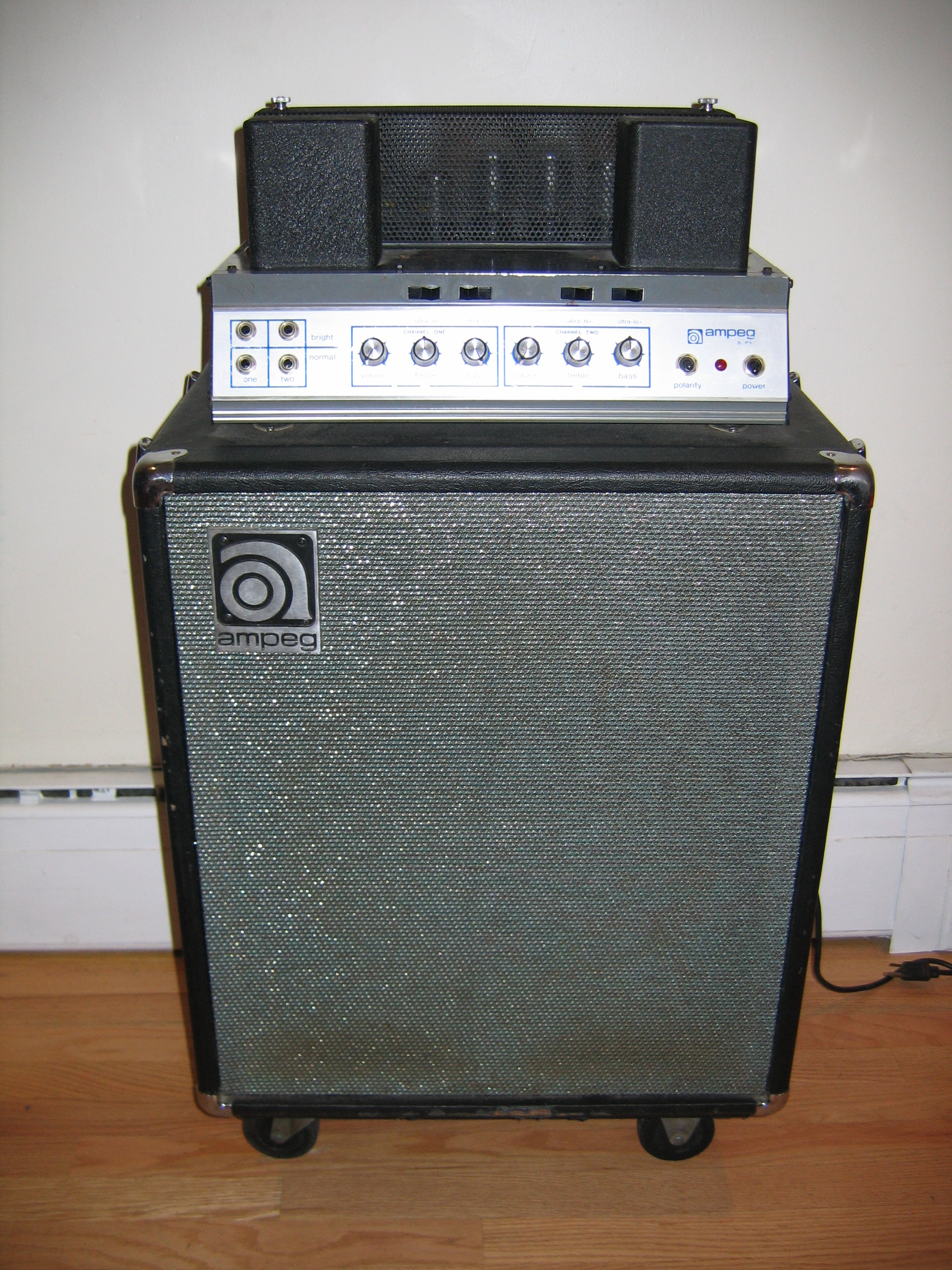
B-15N

The Portaflex is a line of amplifiers for electric guitars and bass guitars created by Ampeg and originally designed by Jess Oliver. Portaflex referred to the amps’ portable reflex baffle system. The innovative ‘flip-top’ amplifier head design helped dissipate heat and reduce chassis and tube vibration during use, and inverted to store inside the cabinet for portability. The speaker cabinets were carefully tuned with ports and baffling. The introduction of the Portaflex series established a new standard for bass amplification and completely replaced Ampeg’s previous amplifier lineup. The Portaflex line has many different configurations.

== B-15 ==
The first amp in Ampeg’s Portaflex series was the B-15, a 2-channel tube amplifier 25-watt amp with per-channel volume controls and shared Baxandall-type tone control, housed within a ’flip-top’ tuned-port cabinet design mounted to a dolly.

Shortly after the B-15’s introduction in 1960, it became the most popular bass amp in the world. Thanks to the Manhattan Bass Club, there were B-15s in every professional recording studio in New York, and the B-15 was embraced by the most prolific session bass players of the time, such as James Jamerson and Bob Babbitt at Motown in Detroit, Donald “Duck” Dunn at Stax Records in Memphis, and Chuck Rainey in New York and Los Angeles. In subsequent decades, popularity of the B-15 endured, used by bassists like Darryl Jones, Justin Meldal-Johnsen, and Owen Biddle.

== SB-12 ==
Ampeg manufactured the Portaflex SB-12 model amplifier from 1965-1971. This lightweight (43 lbs) cabinet incorporated the flip-top design of other larger Portaflex amplifiers of the time. Although the SB-12 isn't as well known as the more powerful B-15, it is still highly sought after by musicians who use it mainly for studio recording.

The 'SB' in SB-12 stood for string bass; the '12' indicates the diameter of the speaker in inches. It contained a single-channel, 25-watt tube amplifier and a single Jensen speaker. Unlike most of the Portaflex line of bass amplifiers, the SB-12 was designed as a universal amplifier. It incorporated two separate inputs, one labeled "Bass" and the other "Instruments".

== Gallery ==
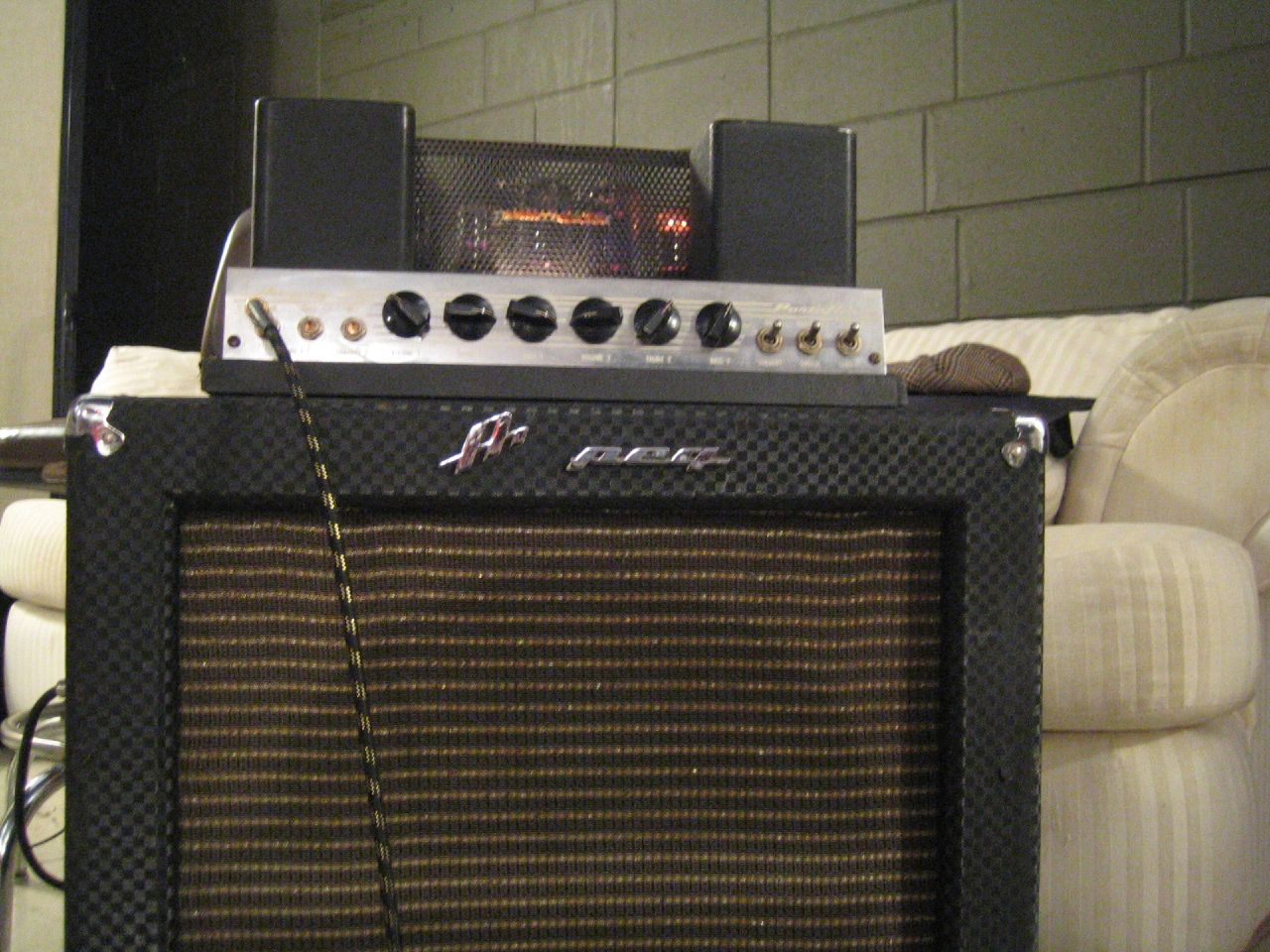
Portaflex B-15N (1960s)

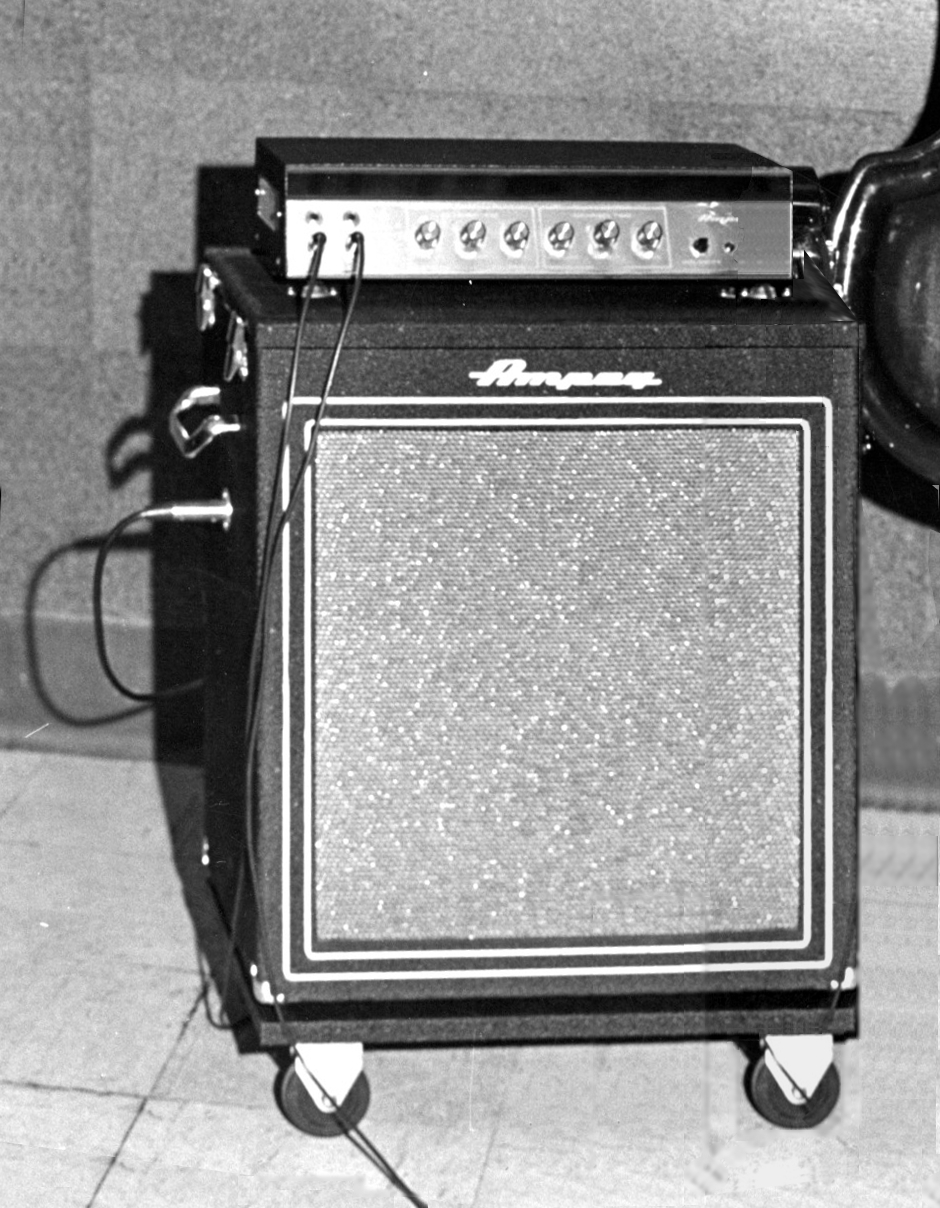
BT-15 (1966/1967-?) transistor amp head

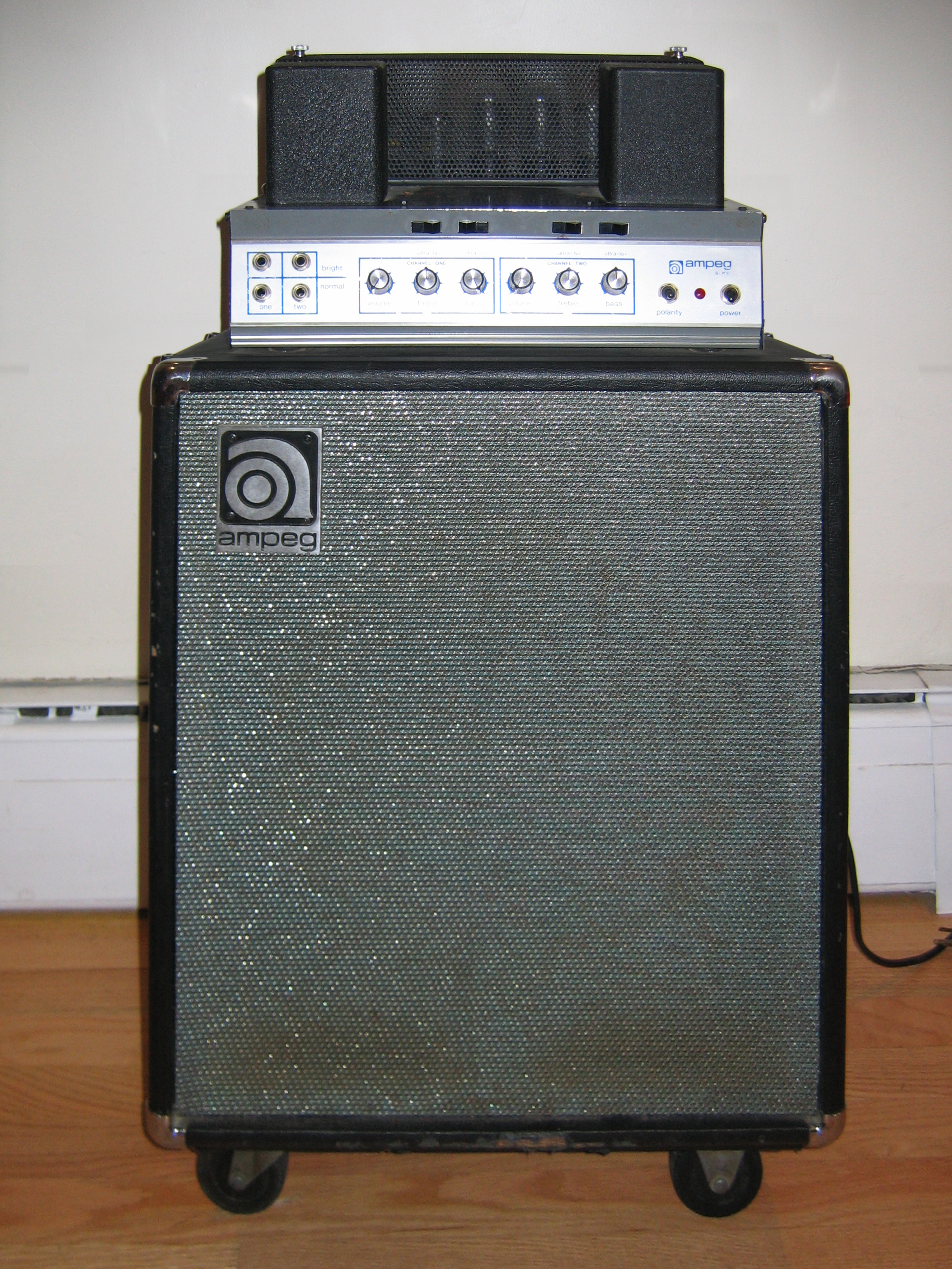
Portaflex B-15N (1970s)

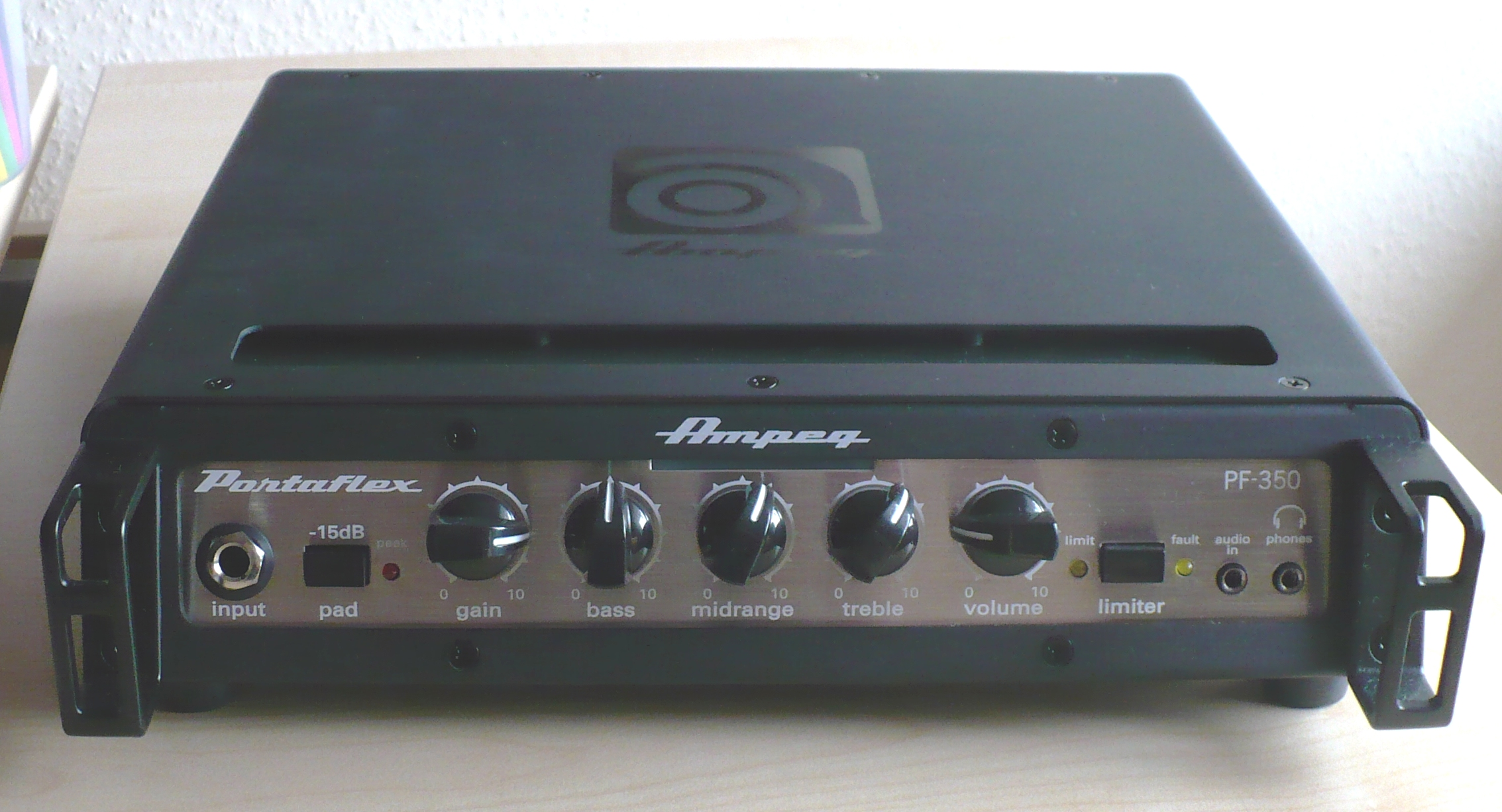
Portaflex PF-350 class-D amp head
