= Ampeg =

American audio equipment manufacturer

- Formerly: Michael-Hull Electronic Labs
- Type: Private
- Industry: Musical instruments
- Founded: 1946; 80 years ago
- Founder: Everett Hull, Stanley Michaels
- Headquarters: Calabasas, California, US
- Area served: Global
- Products: Bass & guitar amps Electric & acoustic upright basses pickups Bass guitars Electric guitars
- Parent: Yamaha Corporation
- Subsidiaries: Dan Armstrong
- Website: ampeg.com

Ampeg ("amplified peg") is a manufacturer best known for its bass amplifiers.

Originally established in 1946 in Linden, New Jersey by Everett Hull and Stanley Michaels as "Michael-Hull Electronic Labs," Ampeg has been part of the Yamaha Guitar Group since 2018. Although specializing in the production of bass amplifiers, Ampeg has previously manufactured guitar amplifiers and pickups and instruments including double basses, bass guitars, and electric guitars.

== History ==
=== Early years (1946―1959) ===
Everett Hull (born Charles Everitt Hull), a pianist and bassist from Wisconsin working with bandleader Lawrence Welk in Chicago, had invented a pickup for upright bass in an effort to amplify his instrument with more clarity. Hull's design placed a transducer atop the inside of the tailpin (or endpin, attached to the tailpiece), a peg for holding up the instrument while it is played. This inspired his wife Gertrude to name the invention the "Ampeg," an abbreviated version of "amplified peg." On February 6, 1946, Hull filed a patent application for his "sound amplifying means for stringed musical instruments of the violin family," for which U.S. patent 2,430,717 was awarded the following year. The Hulls relocated to New Jersey, and Everett met electrical engineer and amp technician Stanley Michael, who was selling a bass amplifier of his own design, soon renamed the Michael-Hull Bassamp. In 1946, they established Michael-Hull Electronic Labs in Newark, New Jersey, to sell their two products. Michael left the company in 1948, leaving it to Hull, who relocated the company the following year to 42nd Street in Manhattan, above the New Amsterdam Theatre, renaming it "The Ampeg Bassamp Company."

Michael-Hull advertised in DownBeat magazine, listing bassists like Chubby Jackson and Johnny Frigo as endorsers. Additionally, Eddie Safranski signed on with Michael-Hull to promote Ampeg products, receiving a royalty payment for equipment sold by their influence. After Michael's departure, Hull continued to leverage connections with well-known musicians to increase awareness of his products within the New York jazz community; Ampeg's new location between Carnegie Hall, NBC Studios in 30 Rockefeller Plaza, and the Paramount Theatre helped establish relationships with bassists like Oscar Pettiford, Joe Comfort, Amos Milburn and Don Bagley.

In 1955, local musician and electrician Jess Oliver visited Ampeg's offices to purchase an amplified peg, and upon easily making the installation himself, Hull offered him a job. Oliver didn't join Ampeg on a full-time basis until 1956, the same year that Ampeg's name was simplified to "The Ampeg Company." In 1959, the company was incorporated as "The Ampeg Company, Inc.," with Everett Hull as President, Gertrude Hull as Secretary, and Jess Oliver as Vice President.

=== Growing pains and a changing market (1960―1967) ===
In 1960, Ampeg introduced the B-15, a bass combo amplifier with an innovative flip-top function, invented and patented by Oliver. The B-15 was the first in the company's Portaflex series, and after becoming the preferred studio amp of session musicians like James Jamerson and Chuck Rainey. The B-15 and its subsequent variants went on to become the most-recorded bass amplifier in history. By 1963, the Portaflex series business had grown to 44% of Ampeg's amplifier sales. In 1962, Ampeg introduced the plastic-bodied Baby Bass, a compact upright electric bass created from the Zorko bass, whose design Ampeg had acquired from the Dopera brothers, along with a unique Oliver-designed, Ampeg-patented pickup.

In 1962, Ampeg and its 40 employees moved to a new manufacturing facility in Linden, New Jersey. At 8,000 square feet, it was three times larger than their previous home. In June of the following year, after continued struggles to meet production demands and maintain cash flow, Ampeg announced an initial stock offering and became a publicly held company. By 1964, Ampeg had 100 employees and needed more space, relocating to a larger space one block away.

The combination of the rising popularity of rock and roll and the shift of bassists from upright bass to electric bass guitar during this time posed a challenge to Ampeg’s core business. The company's ads continued to feature prominent classical, jazz, and country artists, but with a notable absence of rock artists, and Hull strove to minimize rock musician visits to Ampeg's facilities. Hull's distaste for rock and roll music was further compounded by the success of Ampeg's chief competitor, Fender, as they continually bested Ampeg in overall sales. Through the 1960s, Ampeg amplifiers were designed for "clean, undistorted sound", with Hull saying "we will never make anything for rock 'n' roll".

The company continued to experience growing pains – by October 1966, with 200 employees and 40,000 square feet of space, Ampeg's production capacity had increased to $350,000 per month, yet had $3.5 million in unfulfilled backorders. Amidst company struggles related to growth and manufacturing, as well as disagreements with Hull, Oliver resigned from Ampeg. Hull began to seek potential buyers for the company.

=== Ampeg enters the rock market (1967―1970) ===
In September 1967, Ampeg became a subsidiary of Unimusic Inc. when the newly formed investor group acquired a majority share of Ampeg stock. Unimusic consisted of investors interested in capitalizing on opportunities in the highly fragmented music equipment market of the time, not unlike CBS (which owned Fender and Rhodes), or later Norlin (which owned Gibson Guitars, Lowrey and Moog Music). While Hull was retained as President of Ampeg, Unimusic had purchased the company with the intention of using as a starting point for change. After a year of conflict between Hull and Unimusic, Hull tendered his resignation on October 3, 1968. Unimusic introduced a redesigned Ampeg logo and a new series of advertisements targeted at the rock market. In an effort to establish an Ampeg presence in key music markets, Ampeg opened regional offices: in Chicago; in Nashville near the Ryman Auditorium; and in the Hollywood Palladium in Hollywood.

Ampeg chief engineer Bill Hughes and Roger Cox, with input from Bob Rufkahr and Dan Armstrong (a New York session guitarist and guitar expert hired as a consultant), were developing what Cox envisioned as the “biggest, nastiest bass amplifier the world had ever seen.” The Rolling Stones anticipated using Hiwatt DR-103 amps, as during their 1969 Hyde Park gig, which they brought from England. Their road manager, Ian Stewart, contacted Rich Mandella at the Ampeg office in Hollywood, and Rich arranged for the band to use five prototype amplifier heads of this new high-output model. These employed a 14-tube design to generate 300 watts of power in an era when most tube amps generated less than 100. The Rolling Stones took these prototypes and Mandella on tour, playing all guitars and basses through them for the entire tour. After the tour, Ampeg put the design into production as the SVT, introducing it at the NAMM Show in 1969.

After Armstrong and his amp tech Tom Duffy began modifying B-25 bass heads for rock guitar, the design team responsible for the SVT created the V series, introducing the V-3, V-2 and V-4 heads, VT-22 and VT-40 combos in 1970. The V-2, V-4 and V-22 were adopted by high-profile guitarists like Ron Wood and Keith Richards; both would use Ampeg SVT heads and cabs until 1981, when they replaced the SVTs with Mesa Boogie Mark I and Coliseum 300 amps.

Armstrong designed a transparent plastic guitar and bass for Ampeg. The guitar was used by Keith Richards with The Rolling Stones during the same 1969, 1970, and 1971 tours and some early shows of the 1972 tour, and the bass version by Bill Wyman on the 1972 tour and some of the 1973 Winter tour shows. In 1971, citing lack of compensation for his contributions to the V-series amplifiers, Armstrong left Ampeg, and refused to renew the agreement allowing manufacture his guitar and bass.

=== Changes in ownership (1971―1985) ===
In 1971, Ampeg was acquired by Magnavox, which owned musical instrument manufacturer Selmer, but was better known for televisions, radios and hi-fi components. The following year, Magnavox dissolved Ampeg’s incorporation and moved Ampeg’s management to the Selmer-Magnavox offices in Elkhart, Indiana. In 1974, amidst economic struggles and production capacity surpluses, Magnavox closed Ampeg’s Linden plant, moving production to a portion of a Magnavox electronics factory there. In 1978, SVT designer Bill Hughes left the company.

In 1980, Ampeg was acquired by Music Technology, Inc. (MTI), a wholesaler specializing in amplifiers from Japan and keyboards from Italy looking to expand. Under MTI management, SVT and V series amps were prototyped for production in Japan (though V series were never produced). MTI also introduced five new solid-state amps and six new tube amps for Ampeg, and a series of effects pedals. But after production issues and substandard sales, MTI declared bankruptcy a few years later.

=== St. Louis Music and LOUD (1986―2018) ===
In 1986, St. Louis Music (SLM) acquired the assets of Ampeg, including the rights to the name and all remaining MTI inventory. SLM converted leftover V5 heads into SVT-100s and set out to re-create the SVT, setting aside a room at SLM Electronics for an intensive development project. Working from original SVT drawings and parts purchase orders from 1969, the team created a run of 500 amplifiers in 1987 dubbed the Limited Edition SVT-HD amps. SLM then re-established Ampeg manufacturing in its Borman Avenue factory in St. Louis, introducing fourteen new Ampeg guitar and bass amps and the world’s largest bass amplifier at the 1987 summer NAMM Show.

In 2005, LOUD Technologies Inc. purchased St. Louis Music and its brands, including Ampeg and Crate amplifiers, ending their production at the Yellville, Arkansas facility in March 2007, outsourcing amplifier manufacture to contract manufacturers in Asia.

In May 2018, following the purchase of Loud Technologies Inc. by Transom, the Ampeg brand was acquired from the restructured LOUD Audio LLC by Yamaha Guitar Group, Inc.

The current Ampeg company is mainly known in the field of bass amps. They also have a line of guitar amplifiers and a remake of the Dan Armstrong guitar and bass.

Ampeg holds six U.S. patents under the Ampeg brand name.

== Amplifiers ==
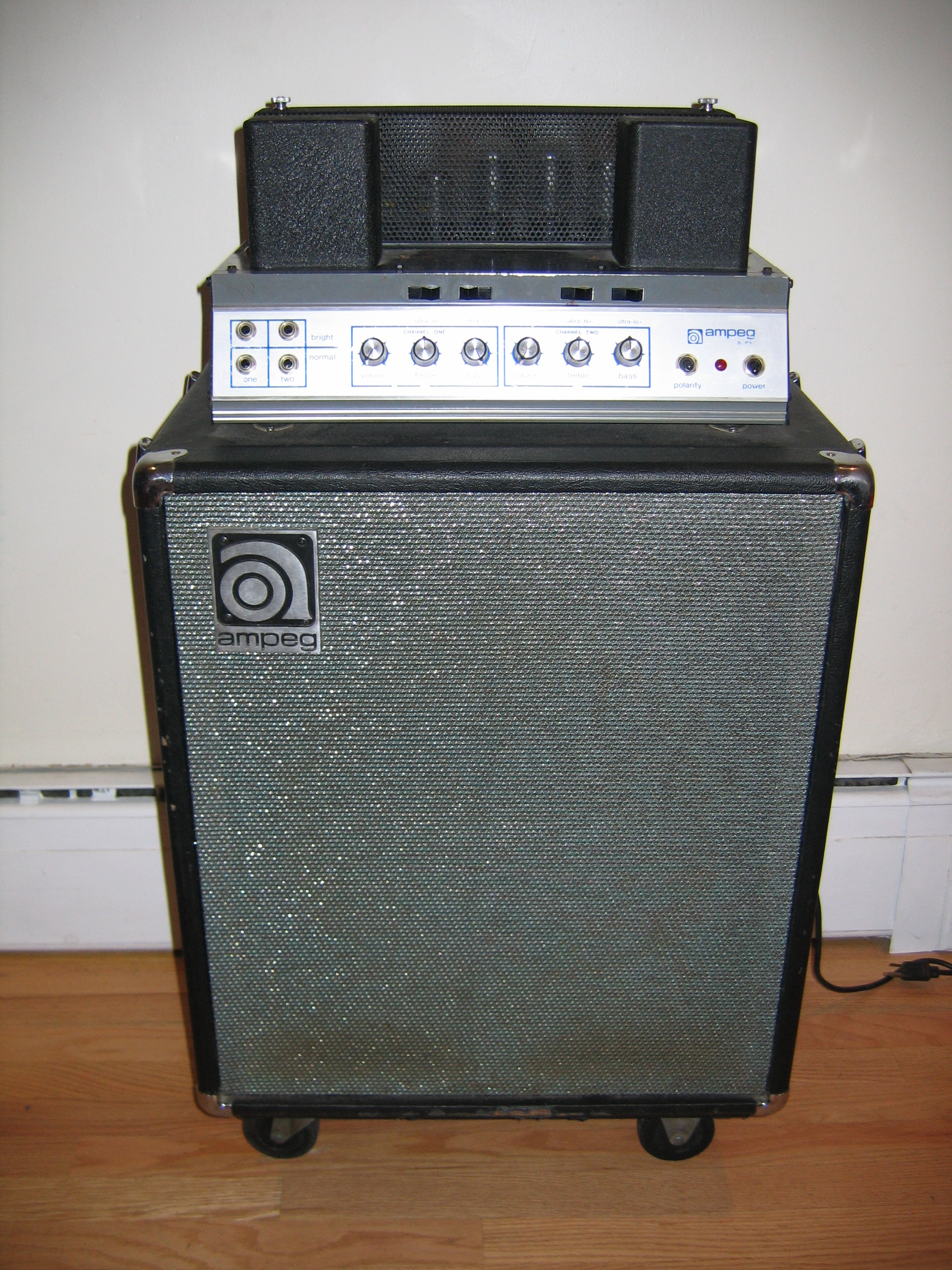
Ampeg Portaflex B-15N (early 1970s)

=== Ampeg Portaflex ===
In the late-1950s Jess Oliver invented a combo amplifier with a chassis that could be inverted and tucked inside the speaker enclosure to protect the vacuum tubes. This combo bass amp was introduced in 1960 as the Portaflex, and remained a popular choice through the 1960s.

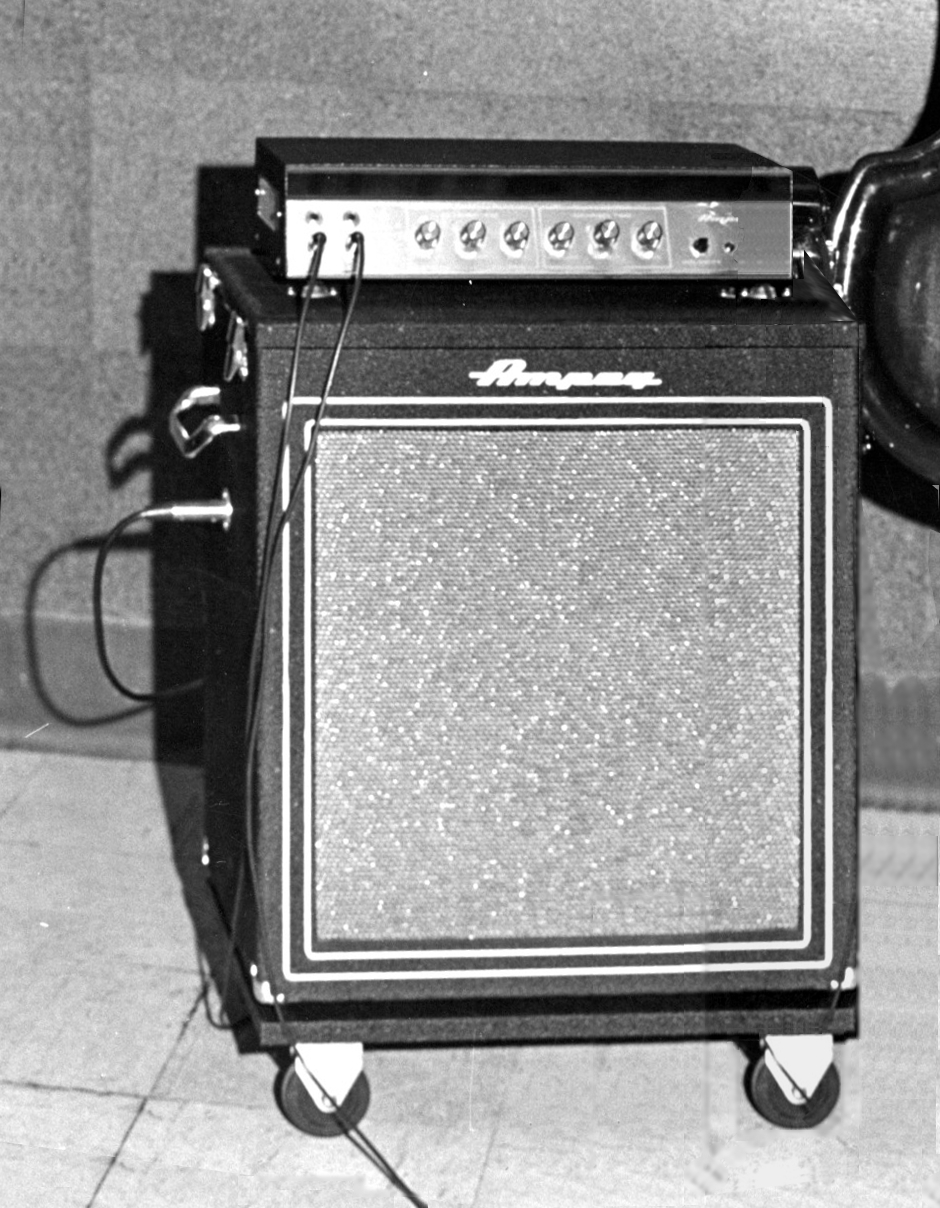
BT-15 transistor bass amp (1966/1967)

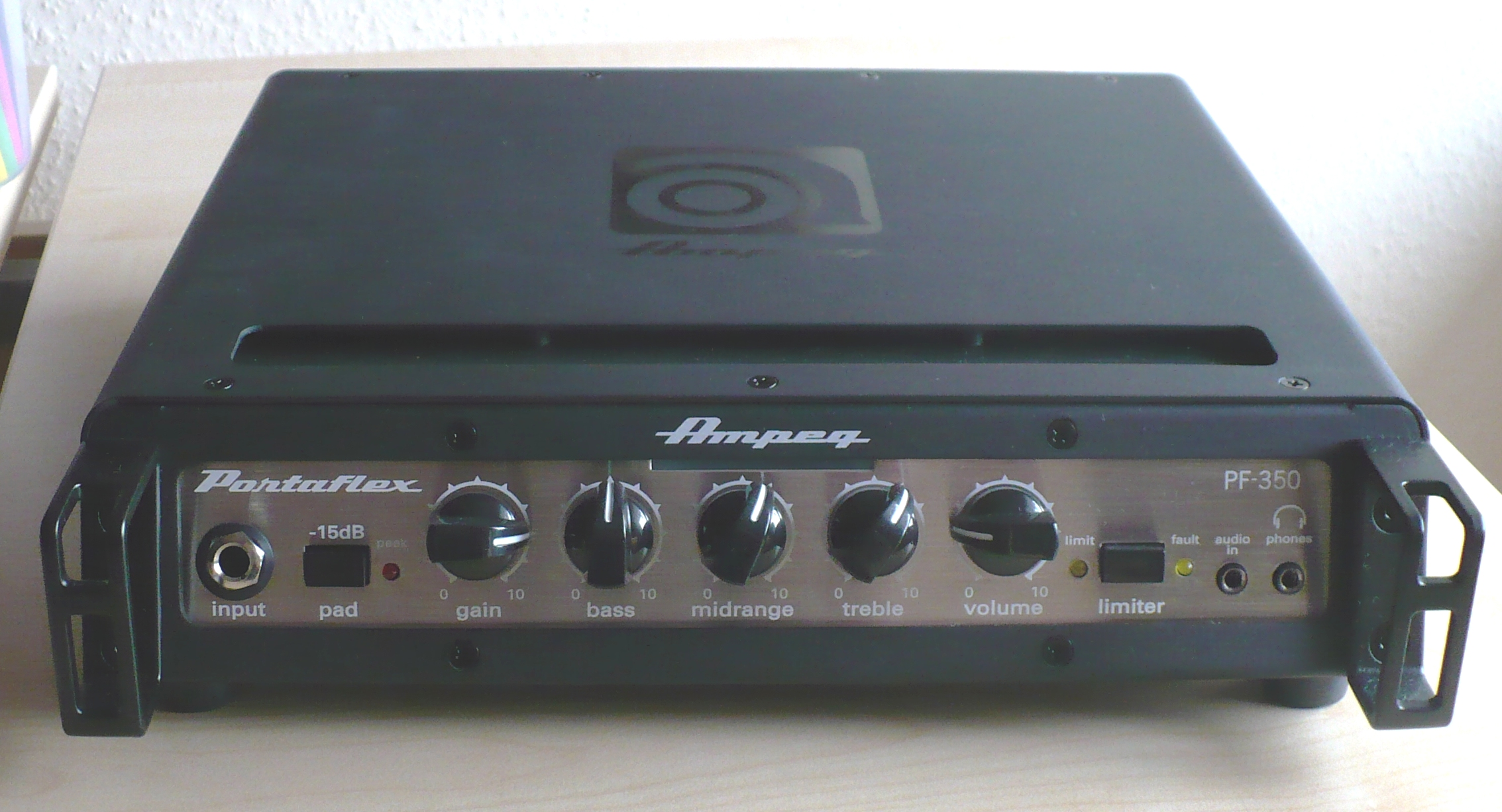
Portaflex (2011)
PF-350 Class-D Head

=== Reverberocket ===
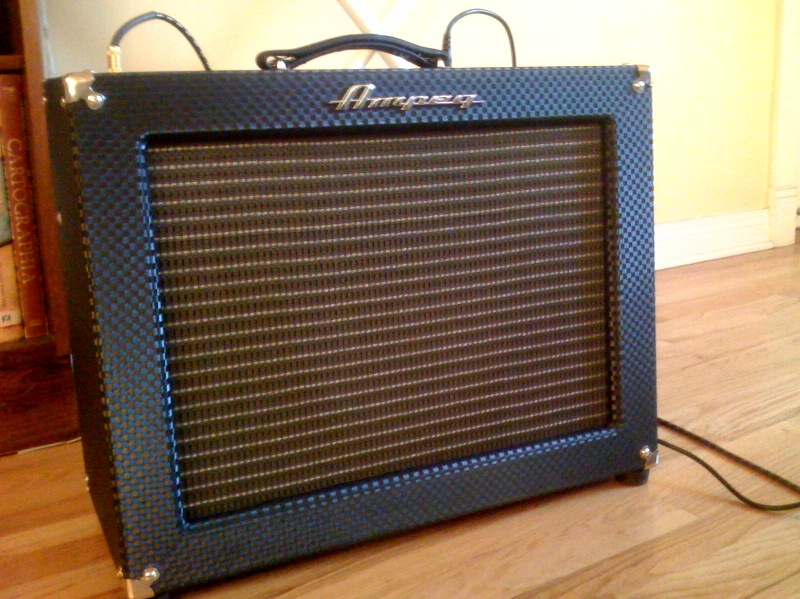
Ampeg R-12-R Reverberocket

In 1961, Ampeg became the first company to incorporate reverberation (reverb) in an amplifier with its Reverberocket, which preceded Fender's Vibroverb amp by nearly two years. Despite Hull's distaste for rock and roll and resistance to distortion, the Reverberocket employed 6V6 -type power tubes which sounded "Fendery" and did break up in a way that rock and roll players could use.

Other vintage models

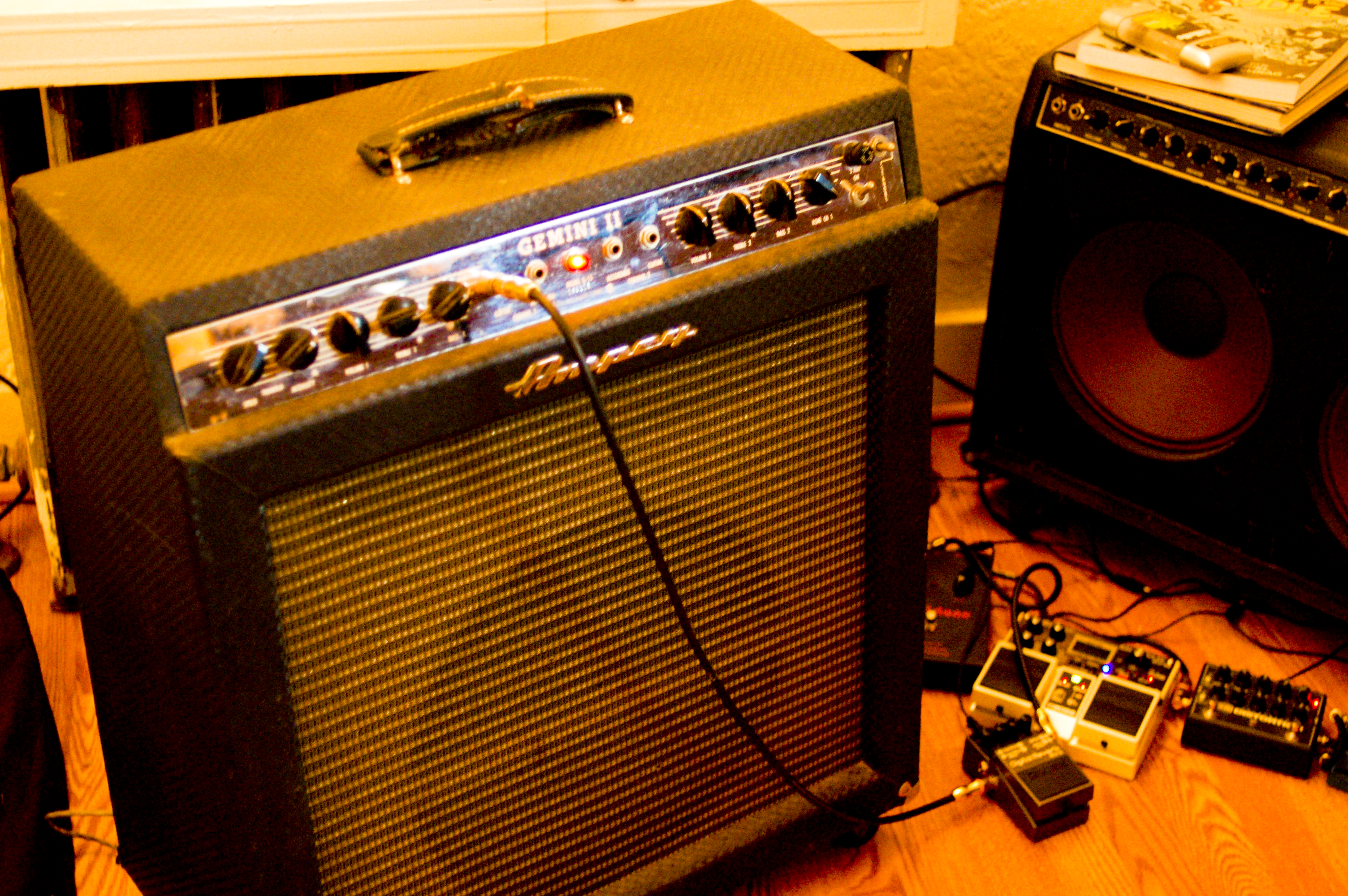
Gemini II G-15L (1965-1968)

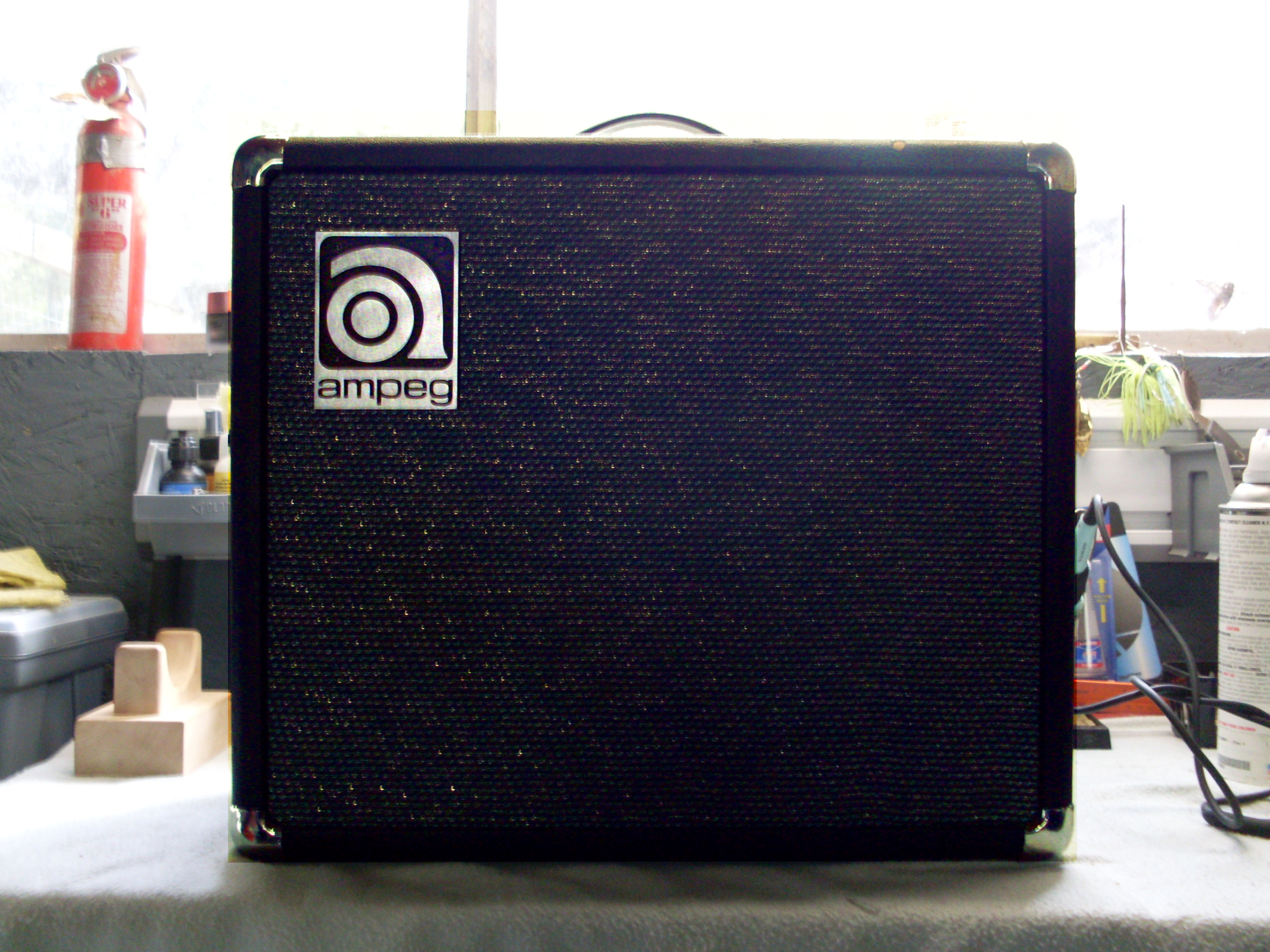
GT-10 solid state guitar amp (1971-1980)

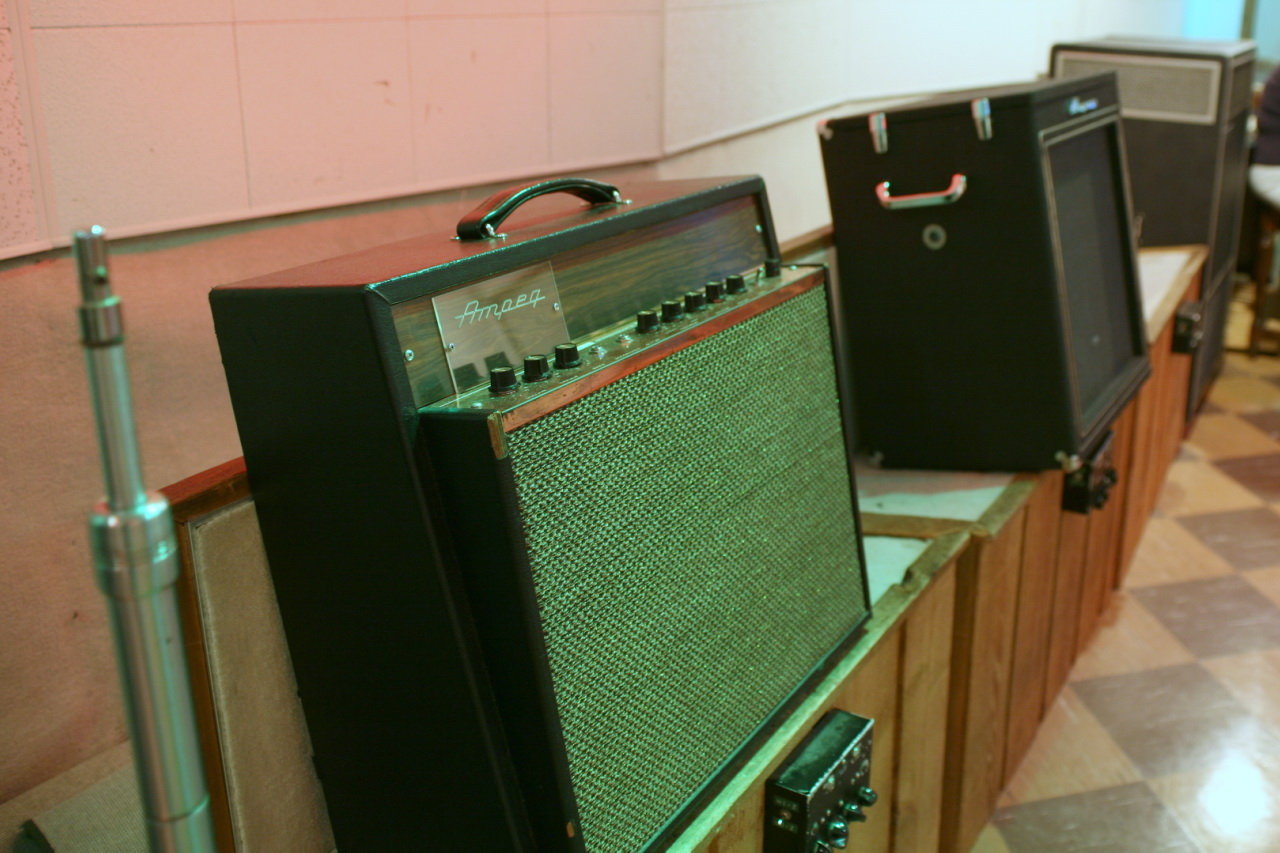
vintage Ampeg amps
at RCA Studio B

=== Super Valve Technology ===
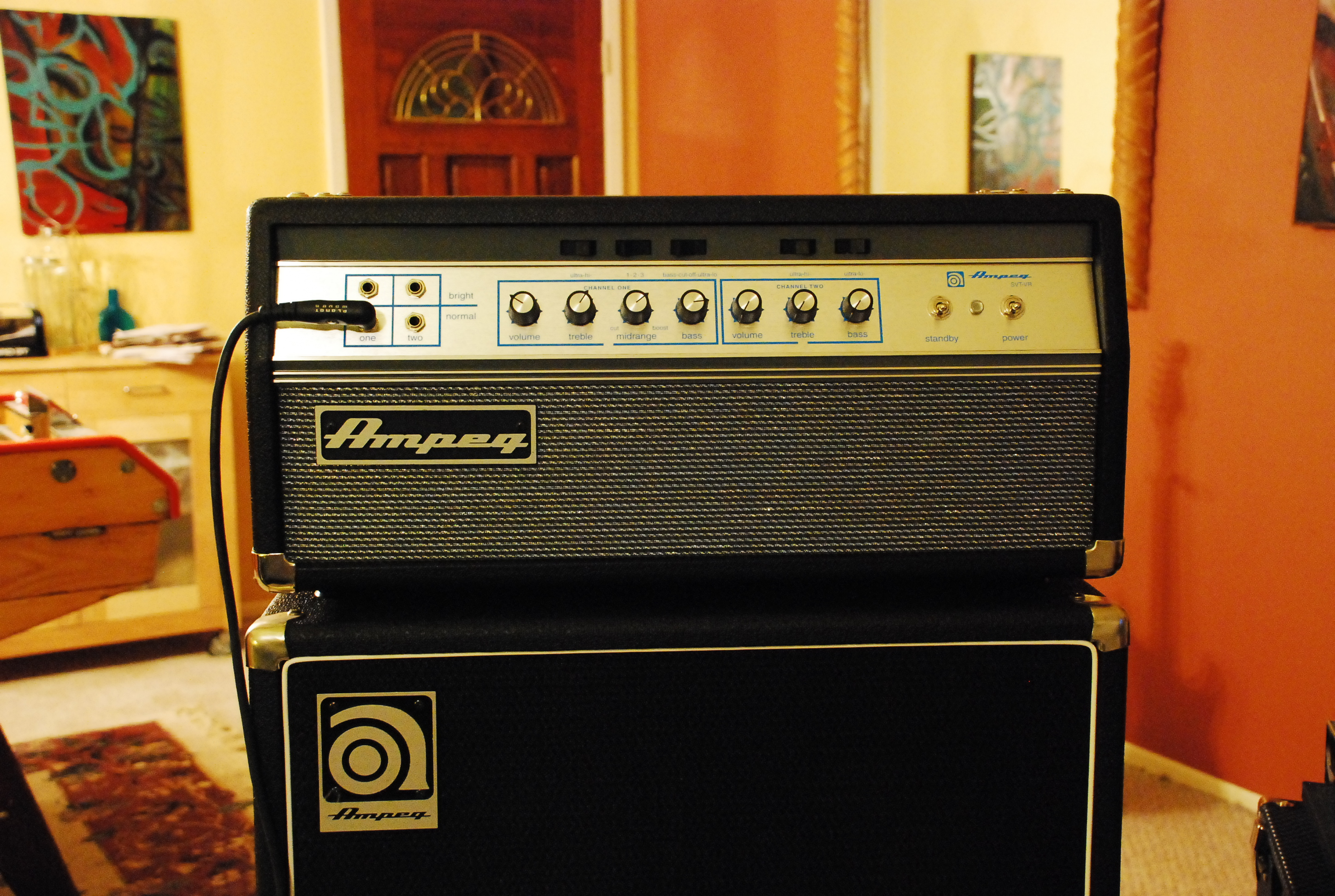
Ampeg SVT VR "Vintage Reissue"

During the 1960s Ampeg only produced fairly low wattage combo amplifiers. Rock concerts were becoming increasingly large affairs and bigger amplifiers were needed. In 1969, Ampeg's Chief Engineer Bill Hughes designed the Super Valve Technology circuitry for the amplifier of the same name. At 85 lb (39 kg), the Ampeg SVT provided 300 watts of RMS power, considerably more than most other bass amplifiers of the era. The high power rating made the SVT a candidate for use in larger venues. The SVT saw widespread use by rock acts in the 1970s and is still considered by many to be the world standard reference bass amp. The SVT-VR (Vintage Reissue) is almost identical in design and construction and the closest thing to any of the original SVT models produced by Ampeg.

Other separate head models

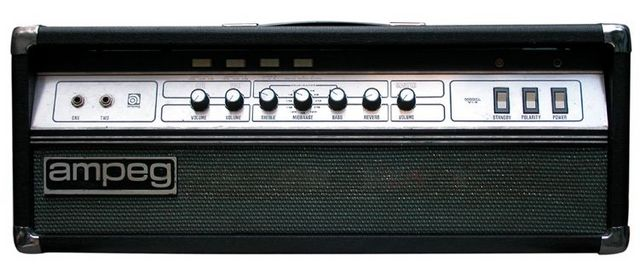
V4 (1970s)

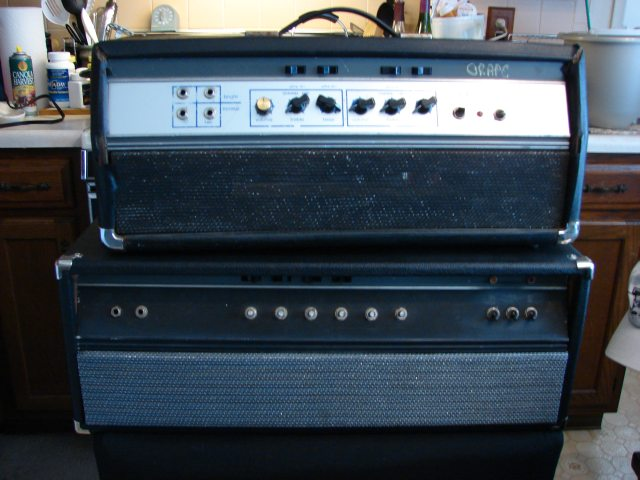
B-25 (c.1969), and
V-4B (1970s) bass heads

=== Recent amplifiers (after 1990s) ===
In the mid-1990s, SLM issued several guitar amplifiers under the Ampeg name. Some of these, the "Diamond Blue Series," used the names of vintage Ampeg models (such as Jet and Reverberocket) and featured the bluish-colored diamond-checkerboard covering associated with Ampeg amps of the 1960s. The circuit designs of these amplifiers, however, were new. The Portaflex bass amp was reissued, with updates intended to make it more appealing to modern bass players.

The Ampeg GVT series, introduced around 2010, is a series of tube amplifiers built in South Korea, employing the Baxandall tone circuit.

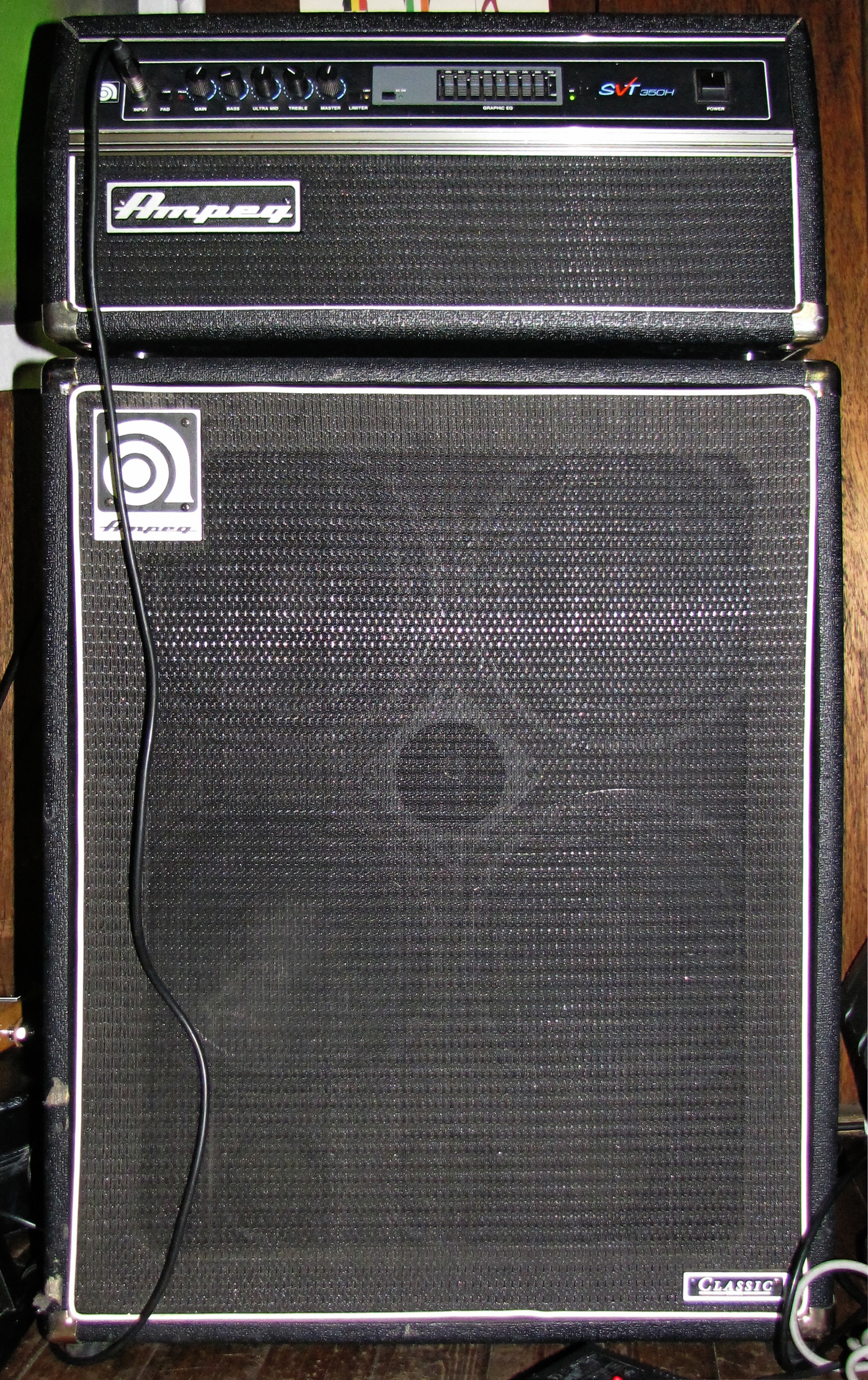
SVT Classic:
SVT-350H (head), SVT-410HLF (cab.)

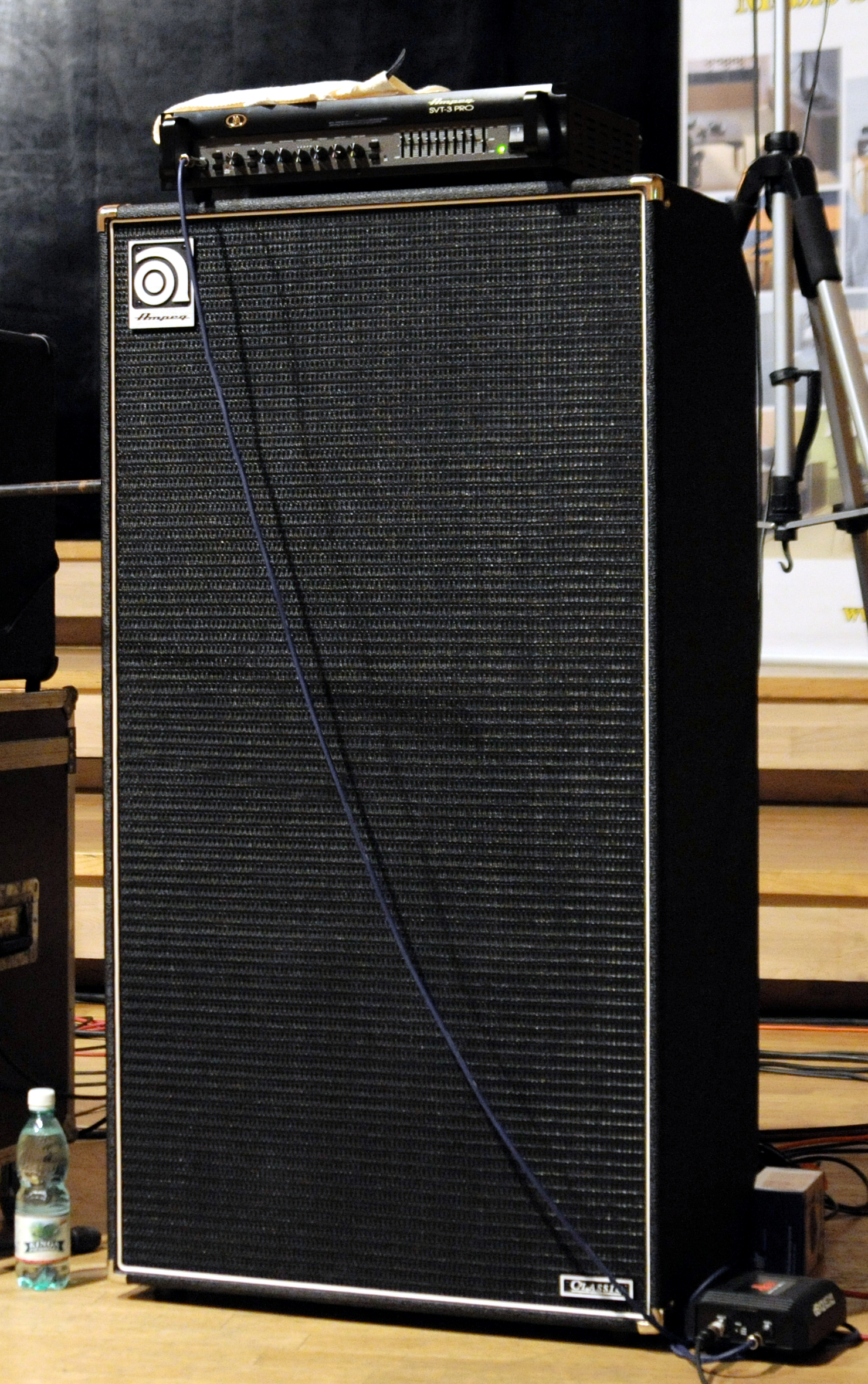
SVT Pro:
SVT-3 Pro (head),
Classic SVT-610HLF (6x10" cab.)

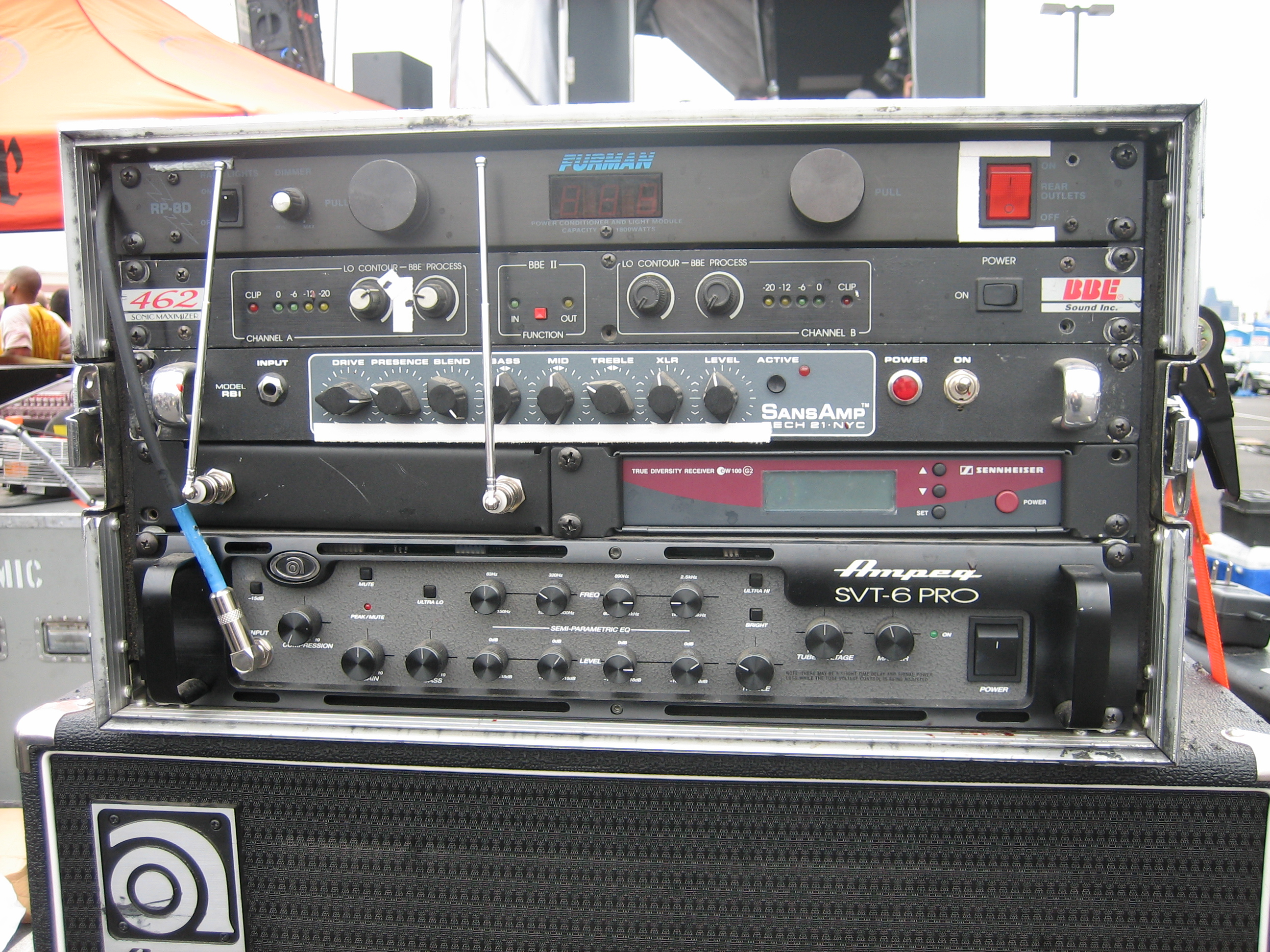
Bass rig with Ampeg SVT-6 Pro

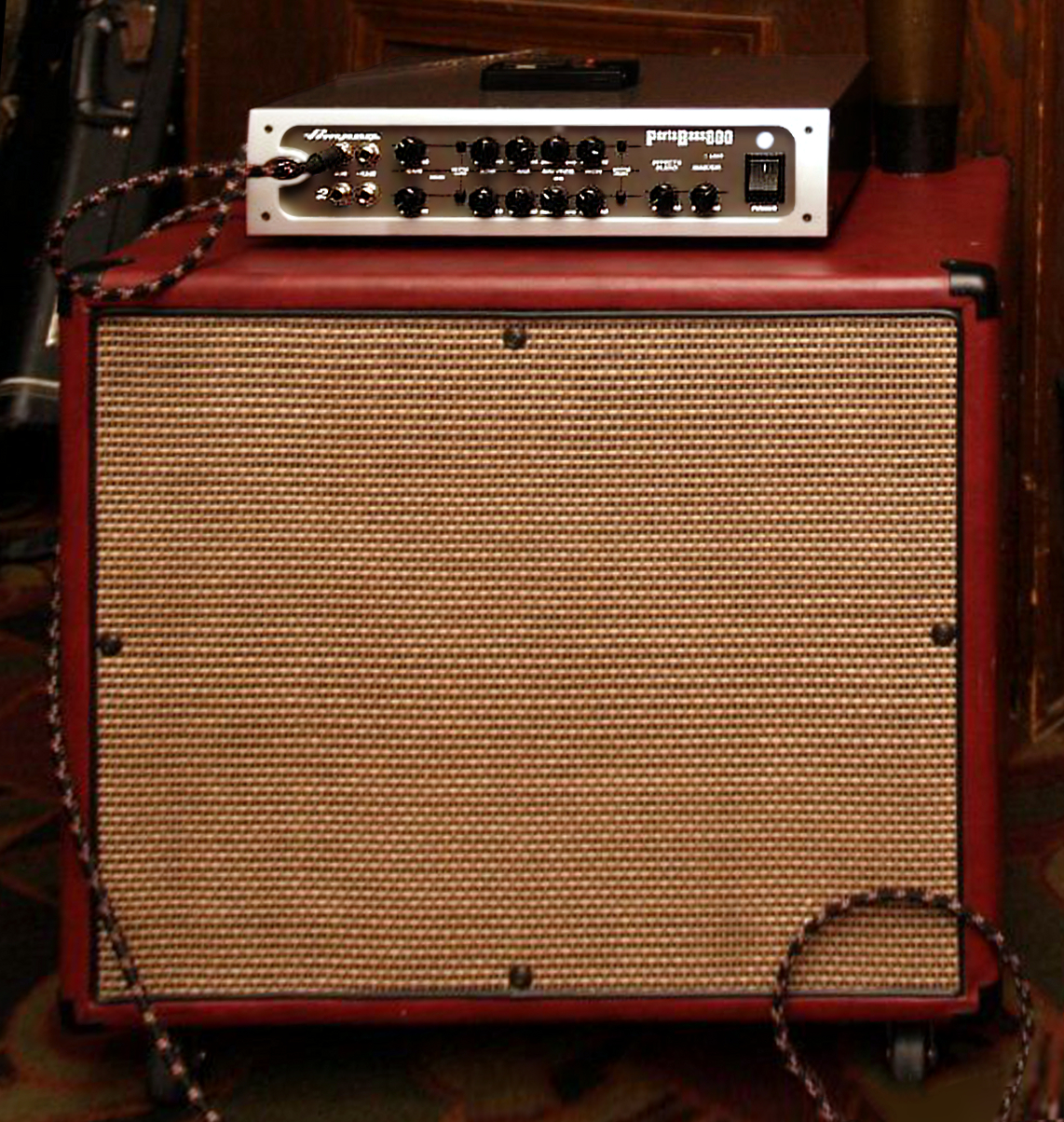
PortaBass 800 (head) with custom cab.

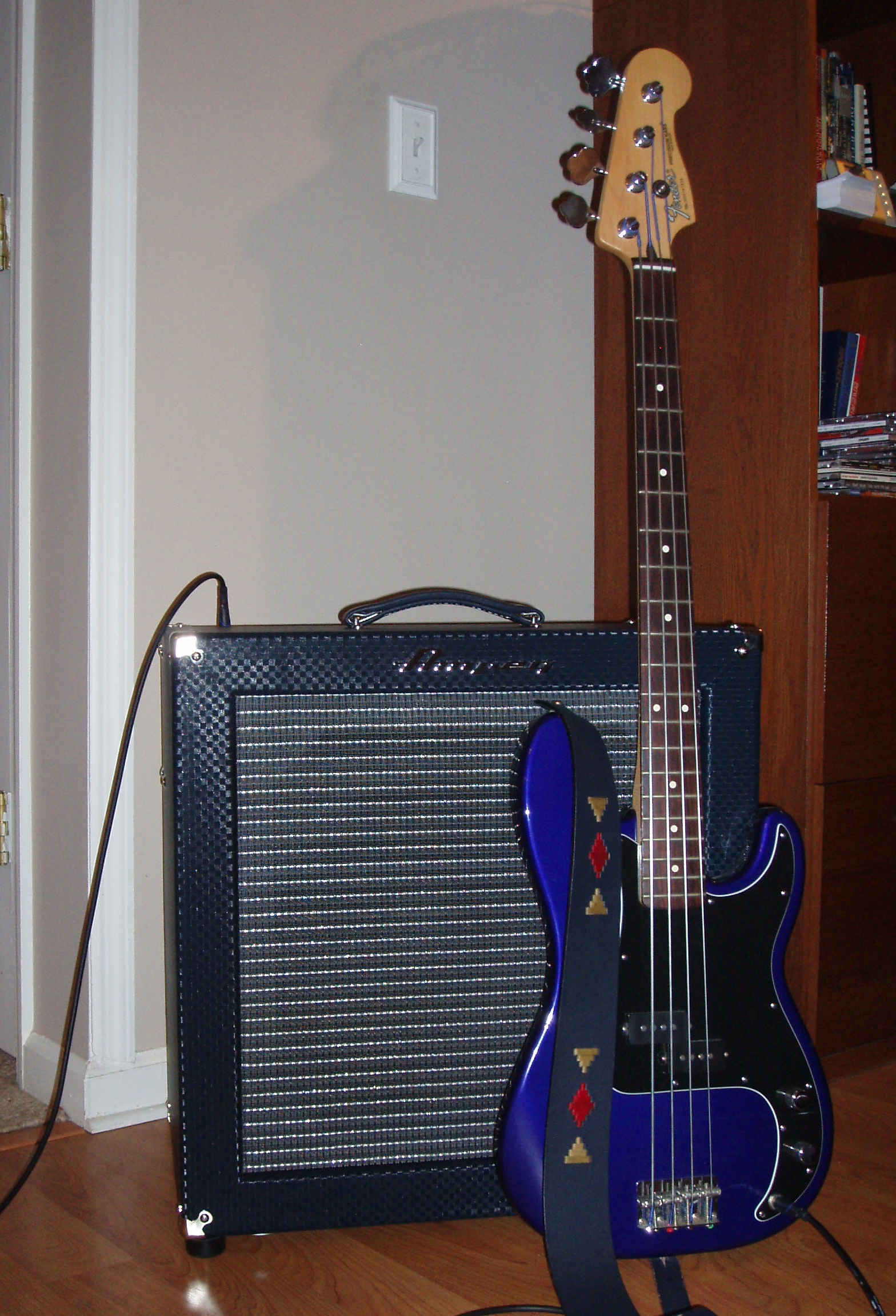
Diamond Blue:
B-200R bass amp

== Instruments and accessories ==
Ampeg also manufactured (or had manufactured for them) lines of instruments to complement their amplifiers.

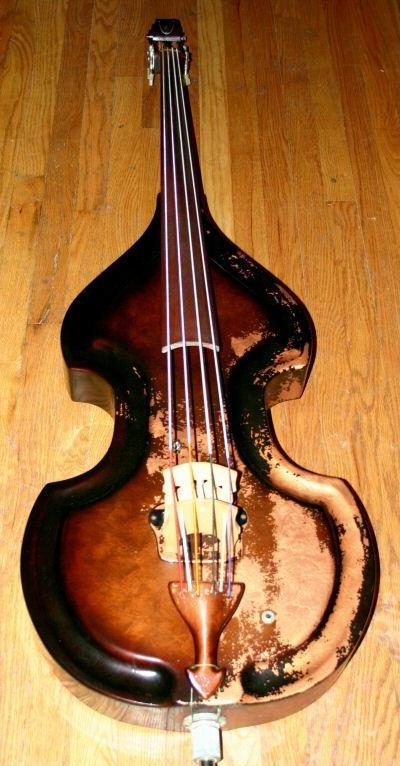
Zorko Bass

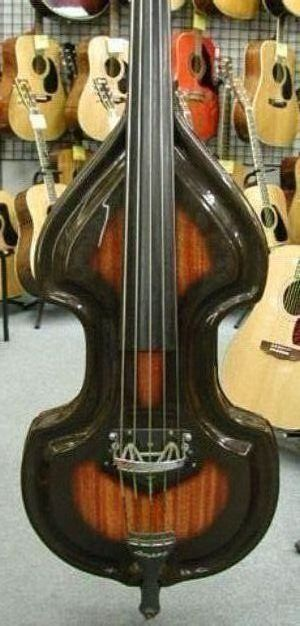
Ampeg Baby Bass

=== Baby Bass ===
Baby Bass, introduced around 1962, was an electric upright bass with a full-size wooden neck and a cello-sized Uvex plastic body. The design was purchased from Zorko, re-engineered by Jess Oliver, and manufactured in a corner of Ampeg's Linden, New Jersey factory. It appeared in Ampeg's price list until about 1970, though popular only with bassists in Latin and salsa bands.

=== Guitars by Burns ===
In the early 1960s, Ampeg-branded guitars and basses were produced by Burns of London. These instruments did not sell well because import costs made them too expensive compared to Fenders and Gibsons. Baldwin's purchase of Burns in 1965 ended the association with Ampeg.

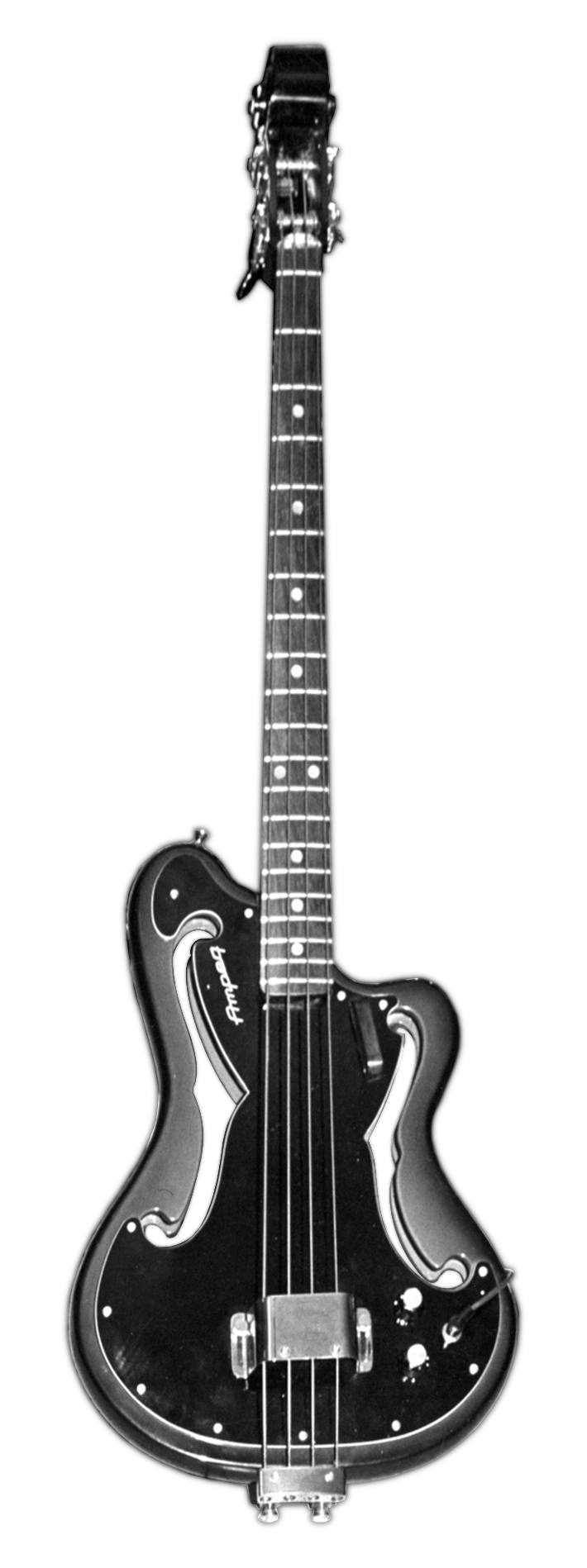
Ampeg AEB-1 Horizontal Bass

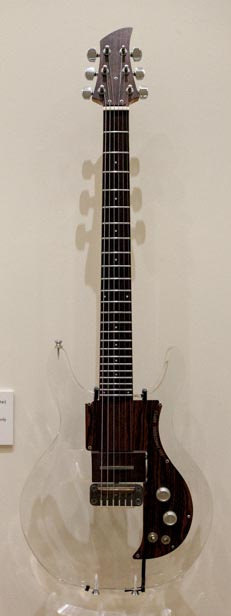
Dan Armstrong see-through (1970)

=== Horizontal Bass and Devil Bass ===
1966–1969, designed by Dennis Kager, etc.

In 1966, Ampeg introduced their home-built line of long-scale "Horizontal Basses" (aka "scroll" or "f-hole" basses), both fretted and fretless (reputed to be the first production fretless electric bass). Some with different bodies were produced as the "Devil Bass" with distinctive horns, but the circuitry was identical. Originally using a transducer below the bridge, they were redesigned around 1968 to use a conventional magnetic pickup. At the same time, short-scale fretted and fretless basses, with magnetic pickups, were also produced.

=== Dan Armstrong "see-through" ===
In 1969, the Horizontal Basses were replaced by the Dan Armstrong-designed "see-through" guitars and basses, with bodies carved from colorless acrylic plastic. The transparent bodies contributed to long sustain but were heavy. The guitars incorporated slide-in user-changeable pickups, and the short-scale basses used two stacked coils with a "pan" pot for a wide range of tones. Production of the "see-through" instruments ended in 1971 when Armstrong left the company.

=== Stud series ===
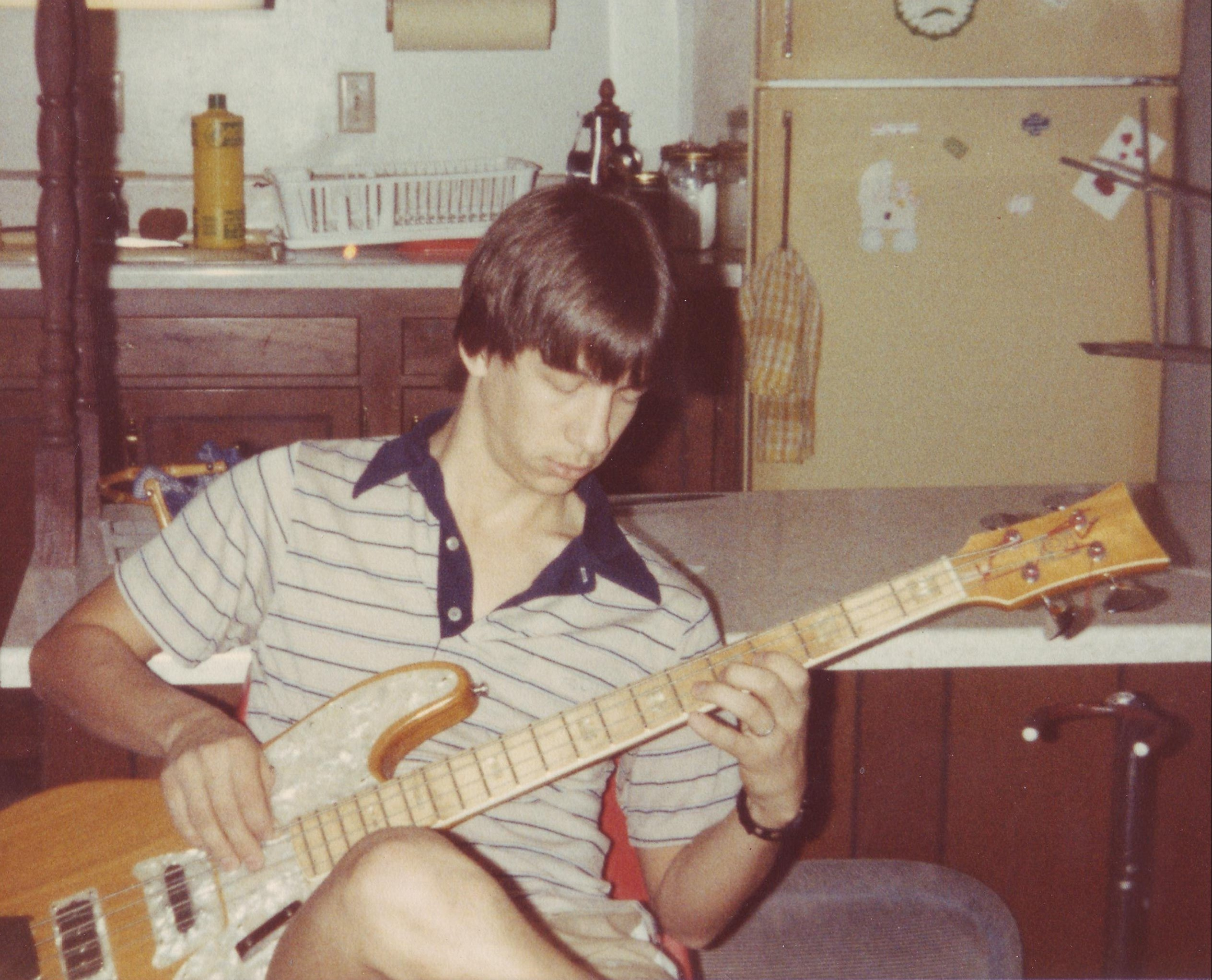
Big Stud electric bass (1973-1975)

In the mid-1970s, Ampeg had a line of Japanese-made guitars and basses under the "Stud" name. The guitars included the Stud, Heavy Stud, and Super Stud, and the basses included the Big Stud and Little Stud. The Studs were knock-offs of popular Fender and Gibson instruments (although the Fender copies sported rather incongruous 3/3 and 2/2 guitar and bass headstocks). Some of the Stud instruments were poorly built (e.g. the plywood bodies and necks on the Little Stud), while others had good-quality features (e.g., gold-plated hardware on the Super Stud).

=== Hagström distribution ===
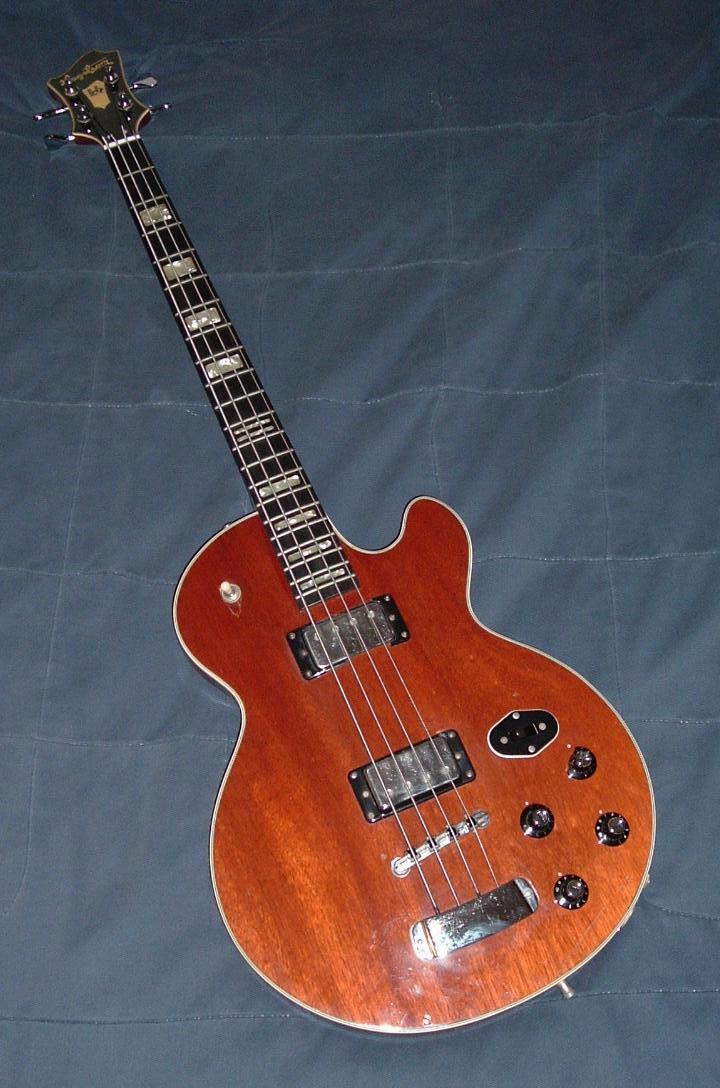
Swede Patch 2000 (1976-79)

In 1971, Ampeg was acquired by Magnavox, which led to a distributorship deal with the Swedish guitar company, Hagström. In 1975, Ampeg and Hagström collaborated to develop their first guitar/synthesizer hybrid using the contact of the strings on the frets as electric switches: In 1976 the Swede Patch 2000 was released, which required Ampeg Patch 2000 Pedals and an external synthesizer (Steiner-Parker Microcon was designed for it).

=== Effects pedals & Accessories ===
Ampeg also produced effects pedals, including stand-alone reverb units in the 60s, the Scrambler (distortion) from 1969 (a resurgence in interest resulted in an updated Scrambler being reissued in 2005 along with Sub-Blaster (octaver) that produced a note one octave down), the Phazzer (phaser) from the mid- to late-70s, and a line of nine stomp boxes produced in Japan in the mid-80s.

There were also Ampeg branded accessories that included covers, picks, strings, straps, polish, as well as two practice amps, the Sound Cube and the Buster (a Pignose clone). Currently, Ampeg mostly offers covers, some outerwear, and a few other accessories with their logo.

=== Recent instruments (after 1990s) ===
In the mid- to late-1990s, Ampeg reissued the Baby Bass, the Horizontal Bass, and the "See-Through" instruments, as well as wooden instruments based on the "See-Through" design.

== Bibliography ==
- Hopkins, Gregg; Moore, Bill (1999). Ampeg: The Story Behind the Sound. Musical Instruments Series. Milwaukee, Wisconsin: Hal Leonard Publishing Corporation. ISBN 978-0-7935-7951-8.
- Fjestad, Zachary R. (2009). "Ampeg/Dan Armstrong Ampeg". Blue Book of Electric Guitars (12th ed.). Blue Book Publications. ISBN 978-1-886768-93-2.
- Fjestad, Zachary R. (2010). "Ampeg". Blue Book of Guitar Amplifiers (4th ed.). Blue Book Publications. ISBN 978-1-936120-05-5.
