= Hypex Electronics =

Dutch electronics company

Hypex Electronics is a Dutch electronics company known for its class-D audio amplifier modules. These employ a control method called Universal class D (UcD), invented by Bruno Putzeys and patented by Philips.

== History ==
The company was formed in 1996. Hypex began producing the UcD in the early 2000s after Philips declined to use Putzeys' technology in its own product range. By 2004, the company had produced a 180-watt Class-D amplifier on a 40-square-centimetre (6.2 sq in) board with around 0.02% total harmonic distortion. Putzeys joined Hypex full-time in 2005, and began working on UcD's follow-up, the NCore, with an improved reduction in distortion with 92% efficiency.

== Products ==
Hypex modules can be found in some high-end audio products, including NAD Electronics (who produce customised versions of the original Hypex UcD) or in musical instrument amplifiers. The TEAC AX-505 amplifier is driven by a Hypex Class D nCore, as is the NAD Master Series M10 streaming amplifier.

The NCore 400 is available in kit form, that allows the module to be used in lower-end equipment. It supports a signal-to-noise ratio of 125 decibels and a switching speed of 470-530 kilohertz.

== Manufacturing ==
The company has its own production facility based in Malaysia. The first factory was established in Simpang Empat in 2011, moving to Parit Buntar in 2017.
