= Putzeys =

Putzeys is a Belgian surname. Notable people with the surname include:

- Armand Putzeys (1916–2003), Belgian cyclist
- Bruno Putzeys (born 1973), Belgian audio engineer
- Jules Putzeys (1809–1882), Belgian magistrate and entomologist
