= Jess Oliver =

- Born: Oliver Jespersen; January 20, 1926
- Died: June 20, 2011 (aged 85)
- Occupation: amplifier designer
- Known for: Ampeg B-15

Jess Oliver (born Oliver Jespersen) (January 20, 1926 – June 30, 2011) was a musician, an inventor, electrician and amplifier repairman best known as the vice-president of Ampeg and patent holder for many of Ampeg's most successful products, most notably the Portaflex B-15.

== Early years ==
Oliver grew up with an interest in music and electronics, assembling crystal radio sets and playing guitar and bass in high school bands. In 1944, at the age of 18, he was drafted into the United States Army and assigned to an infantry radio unit, but a case of pneumonia rendered him medically unfit for combat, and he was re-assigned to play upright bass in the Army Band. After the war, Oliver took advantage of the G.I. Bill to study electronics while continuing to work as a professional musician in Queens.

== Ampeg ==
Oliver visited The Ampeg Bassamp Company to buy one of Everett Hull's amplified pegs for his bass and impressed Hull so much that Hull offered him a job, but it wasn't until the summer of 1956 that Oliver left his work as an electrician to work full-time for Ampeg. Oliver's new employer paid for him to attend night classes at the RCA Institute, where he studied amplifier design and technology, and he applied that knowledge to developing new Ampeg products and improving the efficiencies of its manufacturing production lines. When Ampeg incorporated in 1959, Oliver was designated vice president.

In 1960, Oliver invented and patented the B-15, a bass combo amp with closed-back reflex cabinet, double-baffle porting system, and an innovative flip-top function. The B-15 was the first in Ampeg's Portaflex series, and after becoming the preferred studio amp of session musicians like James Jamerson and Chuck Rainey, went on to become the most-recorded bass amplifier in history. By 1963, the Portaflex series business had grown to 44% of Ampeg's amplifier sales.

In 1961, with the introduction of the Ampeg Reverbrocket, Oliver was the first to integrate Laurens Hammond's new spring reverb into a guitar combo amplifier.

== Oliver Sound Company ==
In 1966, amidst company struggles related to growth and manufacturing, as well as disagreements with Hull, Oliver resigned from Ampeg, forming Oliver Sound Company later that year. At Oliver Sound Company, he invented and manufactured a full line of amplifiers and sound equipment, including new Powerflex amplifiers with a motorized lift platform. Eventually he scaled down manufacturing and operated Oliver Sound as an amplifier service center out of his basement in Massapequa, New York.

== Later years ==
At the 2001 NAMM Show, Ampeg awarded Oliver with "Godfather of Bass Amplification." Oliver also served as technical advisor for the 1997 and 2010 versions of the B-15.

Oliver died on June 30, 2011.

== See also ==
- Ampeg Portaflex
