= Dan Armstrong =

American guitarist, luthier, and session musician

- Born: Dan Kent Armstrong; October 7, 1934; Pittsburgh, Pennsylvania, U.S.
- Died: June 8, 2004 (aged 69); Los Angeles, California, U.S.
- Known for: Session musician; luthier

Dan Kent Armstrong (October 7, 1934 – June 8, 2004) was an American guitarist, luthier, and session musician.

== Biography ==
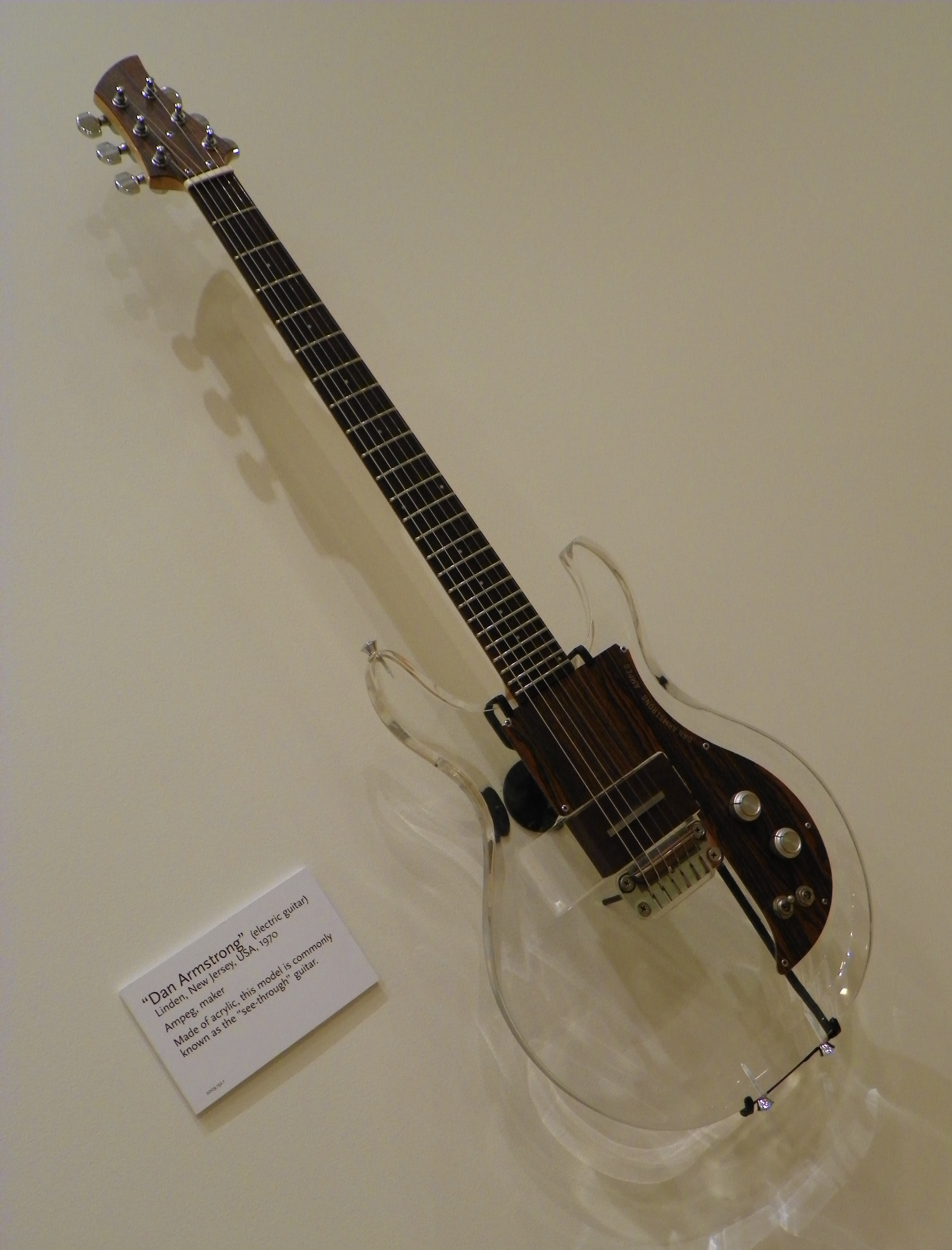
Dan Armstrong Ampeg era "see-through" guitar, in the Phoenix Musical Instrument Museum.

Armstrong was born in Pittsburgh, Pennsylvania. He started playing the guitar at age 11 and moved to New York in the early 1960s in order to work as a studio musician and guitar repairman. In 1965 he opened his own guitar repair shop, 'Dan Armstrong's Guitar Service', on West 48th Street. The building was razed in 1968, and Armstrong relocated his shop, renamed 'Dan Armstrong Guitars', to 500 Laguardia Place in Greenwich Village.

In 1968 the Ampeg Company of Linden, New Jersey, hired Armstrong as a consultant to improve their Grammer line of guitars. He designed a new line of guitars and basses that were constructed of clear Plexiglas. These guitars had interchangeable pickups designed by Bill Lawrence who shared the Greenwich Village shop with Armstrong, and eventually took it over when Armstrong moved to London. The guitars had long sustain caused by the solid Plexiglas body, though that material made for a heavy guitar—around 10 lbs. There was a reissue, made in Japan, in 1998, where the reissue was compared to the 1968 original, as being identical. A second reissue of the Dan Armstrong guitar was launched in 2006.

Armstrong moved to London in the early 1970s where he developed a new line of electric instruments, amplifiers and effects boxes. The Dan Armstrong London instruments were made of solid Honduran mahogany with sliding low impedance pickups, available as a six-string guitar, and short-scale and long-scale basses. Armstrong also marketed a line of tube guitar and bass amplifiers and effects boxes, the Blue Clipper, Yellow Humper, Red Ranger, Purple Peaker, Green Ringer and Orange Squeezer.

In 1977 Armstrong and his wife, Vicki O'Casey, moved back to the United States. A licensing and manufacturing agreement was reached with Musitronics to re-release the effects boxes. Armstrong also developed a line of pickups for Schecter Guitar Research, a new amplifier for Fender. The couple returned to England, where they lived in Ashford, Kent, in the late 1990s, but again moved back to America after several years. After suffering from emphysema for many years, Armstrong died from a combination stroke and heart attack in Los Angeles on June 8, 2004.

Dan Armstrong's son Kent Armstrong and grandson Aaron Armstrong continues to manufacture guitar pickups.

== List of artists ==
- Chett Lehrer of LA's Wasted Youth exclusively from 1980 to 1987
- Randy Jo Hobbs of Johnny Winter and The McCoys and Montrose played the Dan Armstrong Bass in 1970.
- Keith Richards of the Rolling Stones
- John Kay of Steppenwolf
- Cyril Jordan of Flamin' Groovies
- Poison Ivy of the Cramps
- Randy California of Spirit
- Arthur Lee of Love (band)
- Lou Reed and Sterling Morrison of the Velvet Underground, lead overdubs on the LP 'Loaded'
- David Bowie
- Todd Tamanend Clark
- Steve Miller of the Steve Miller Band
- Greg Ginn of Black Flag (Played a Dan Armstrong almost exclusively during Black Flag)
- Earl Slick
- Kyle Toucher of Dr. Know
- Dave Grohl of Foo Fighters
- Ant Forbes of Vex Red
- Paul McCartney of the Beatles (owns the only left-handed Dan Armstrong guitar)
- Phil Lynott of Thin Lizzy
- Randy Rhoads of Quiet Riot (owned by Kevin DuBrow)
- Ronnie Wood of Faces and the Rolling Stones
- Ronnie Lane of Faces
- Rick Richards of the Georgia Satellites and Izzy Stradlin and the Ju Ju Hounds
- Buzz Osborne of the Melvins
- Arlen Roth
- Joe Perry of Aerosmith (with an A bass string where the low E string goes with an Open A tuning for sliding which he uses for "Draw the Line")
- Nile Rodgers of Chic
- Matt Bellamy of Muse, only in the Supermassive Black Hole music video
- Leslie West of Mountain
- Bill Wyman of the Rolling Stones
- Scott Hill, Bob Balch and Brad Davis of Fu Manchu
- George Kooymans of Golden Earring
- Brent Hinds of Mastodon
- Rich Robinson of the Black Crowes
- Justin Hawkins of the Darkness
- John Davis of Superdrag
- Stephen Egerton (guitarist) of Descendents (band) & ALL (band)
- Steve "Stevenson" Borek and Mike Neider (guitarists) of Bl'ast (band)
- Dr. Matt Destruction (Bassist) of The Hives, only in the video "Go Right Ahead Live broadcast from RMV"
- Francis Monkman of Curved Air
- Charlie Starr of Blackberry Smoke
- Josh Homme of Queens of the Stone Age
- Lars Frederiksen of Rancid
- Tom Keifer of Cinderella
- Justin Trosper of Unwound
- Justin Pearson of the Locust
- Mike Lewis of Lostprophets
- Jack Bruce of Cream
- Geezer Butler of Black Sabbath
- Jesse F. Keeler of Death From Above 1979
- Olly Smith of the Vigil
- John Frusciante of Red Hot Chili Peppers in Dani California MV
- Jack Sherman of Red Hot Chili Peppers
- Jeff LaBar of Cinderella
- John Zdravecky of Love Affair

== Relationship with Carly Simon ==
Armstrong had an affair with Carly Simon until around 1971. He is the subject of the song "Dan My Fling" from her debut album and has been reported by some to be the subject (or one of the subjects) of her 1972 song "You're So Vain". In 2010, in relation to a suggestion that David Geffen was the subject of "You're So Vain", Simon stated that when she released the song she had not yet met Geffen.

== Bibliography ==
- Tony Bacon, The Ultimate Guitar Book, New York, Alfred A. Knopf, 1997.
- Tony Bacon, Dave Burrluck, Paul Day, and Michael Wright, Electric Guitars: The Illustrated Encyclopedia, Thunder Bay Press, 2006.
- Gregg Hopkins and Bill Moore, Ampeg: The Story Behind the Sound, Milwaukee, Hal Leonard, 1999.
