= Bruno Putzeys =

Belgian audio engineer

Bruno Putzeys (1973, Brussels, Belgium) is an audio engineer.

== Early life ==
He graduated cum laude at the National Technical School for Radio and Film on the subject of power stages for switching audio amplifiers. Worked for 10 years at the Philips Applied Technologies Lab in Leuven, Belgium, where he developed various digitally and analogue controlled class D amplifiers, noise shapers and modulation methods, and invented among others the "UcD" class D circuit.

== Career ==
In 2005 he left Philips to divide his time between Grimm Audio and Hypex. Current activities include designing high-performance discrete AD/DA converters and analogue signal processing circuits, DSP algorithms, class D power amplifiers and switch-mode power supplies. He holds several patents in the fields of digital audio and power conversion and has published extensively in these and related domains. In 2014 he left Hypex and co-founded Kii Audio to focus on the development of the Kii THREE speakers and in that same year he also cofounded Purifi Audio (focussing on designing OEM speaker drivers and amplifier modules) with Lars Risbo and Peter Lyngdorf, out of a shared conviction that truly significant improvements in musical experience can only be had by addressing technical fundamentals in electromagnetics, mechanics, and acoustics. He also works as consultant for various other companies helping with design of switching power supplies, dsp, dac and amplifier designs.
