= Peter Baxandall =

English audio engineer (1921–1995)

Peter James Baxandall
- Born: 11 August 1921; Kingston upon Thames
- Died: 8 September 1995 (aged 74); Malvern, Worcestershire
- Engineering career
- Discipline: Audio engineering Electronic engineering
- Institutions: King's College School
- Projects: Baxandall tone control circuit
- Awards: AES Silver Medal Award, 1993

Peter James Baxandall (August 11, 1921, Kingston upon Thames, Surrey – September 8, 1995, Malvern, Worcestershire) was an English audio engineer and electronics engineer and a pioneer of the use of analog electronics in audio. He is probably best known for what is now called the Baxandall tone control circuit, first published in a paper in Wireless World.

== Biography ==
Baxandall attended King's College School in London, then got his BSc in electrical engineering at Cardiff Technical College (1942). He was a radio instructor for the Fleet Air Arm for two years, and then worked for the Telecommunications Research Establishment (at the Circuit Research Division headed by Frederic Calland Williams), later renamed and merged to form the Royal Signals and Radar Establishment, until his retirement in 1971. After retiring he worked as a consultant on various audio projects including loudspeakers, tape duplication, and microphone calibration. During this time he continued to publish, including a "seminal chapter" on electrostatic loudspeakers. The Audio Engineering Society made him a Fellow in 1980, and in 1993 awarded him with a Silver Medal for his contributions to the field.

== Baxandall tone control circuit ==
Baxandall's bass and treble control circuit, when made public in Wireless World (1952), "swept all others before it". An early version of the design had already won him an award in 1950 (a $25 watch) at the British Sound Recording Association, a predecessor of the Audio Engineering Society. The design is now employed in millions of hi-fi systems (Baxandall received no royalties for his work).

It exists in several versions—Baxandall's original had two capacitors per potentiometer, but it is possible to use only one at either the treble or bass potentiometers, or both. In audio literature, “Baxandall” is sometimes used generically for bass–treble tone controls, even when the circuit omits negative feedback and more closely follows the earlier passive design published by E. J. James.

== Class D definition ==
In a 1959 paper on transistor wave oscillators, Baxandall proposed the term “class-D” to describe a mode of switching operation in which active devices conduct current only when the voltage across them is low. His analysis treated the output devices as switches rather than linear. Although discussed in the context of oscillators rather than audio power amplifiers, the terminology and operating principles later became associated with class-D power amplification.
