= Tone control circuit =

Type of audio equalization

Tone control is a type of equalization used to make specific pitches or frequencies in an audio signal softer or louder. It allows a listener to adjust the tone of the sound produced by audio equipment to their liking, for example, to compensate for inadequate bass response of loudspeakers or earphones, tonal qualities of the room, or hearing impairment. A tone control circuit is an electronic circuit that consists of a network of filters which modify the signal before it is fed to speakers, headphones or recording devices by way of an amplifier. Tone controls are found on many sound systems: radios, portable music players, boomboxes, public address systems, and musical instrument amplifiers.

== Uses ==
Tone control allows listeners to adjust sound to their liking. It also enables them to compensate for recording deficiencies, hearing impairments, room acoustics or shortcomings with playback equipment. For example, older people with hearing problems may want to increase the loudness of high pitch sounds they have difficulty hearing.

Tone control is also used to adjust an audio signal during recording. For instance, if the acoustics of the recording site cause it to absorb some frequencies more than others, tone control can be used to amplify or "boost" the frequencies the room dampens.

== Types ==
In their most basic form, tone control circuits attenuate the high or low frequencies of the signal. This is called treble or bass "cut". The simplest tone control circuits are passive circuits which utilize only resistors and capacitors or inductors. They rely on the property of capacitive reactance or inductive reactance to inhibit or enhance an AC signal, in a frequency-dependent manner. Active tone controls may also amplify or "boost" certain frequencies. More elaborate tone control circuits can boost or attenuate the middle range of frequencies.

The simplest tone control is a single knob that, when turned in one direction, enhances treble frequencies and the other direction, enhances bass frequencies. This was the first type of tone control, typically found on radios and record players from the 1930s to the 1970s.

Graphic equalizers used for tone control provide independent elevation or attenuation of individual bands of frequencies. Wide frequency range graphic equalizers of high resolution can provide elevation or attenuation in 1/3 octave bands spanning from approximately 30 Hz to 18 kHz.

Parametric equalizers can control not only the amount of boost and cut but also the specific frequency at which the boost and cut takes place and the range of frequencies (bandwidth) affected.

Elaborate circuits may also use amplifiers. The most modern analog units use operational amplifiers, resistors and capacitors, abandoning inductors because of their size and sensitivity to ubiquitous electromagnetic interference.

Historically, tone control was achieved via analog electronics, and most tone control circuits produced today still use the analog process. Nonetheless, digital approaches are increasingly being implemented through the use of digital signal processing.

== See also ==
- Audio power amplifier
- Electronic filter
- Audio crossover
