= Arnold Wolf =

American industrial designer (1927–2013)

- Born: April 30, 1927; San Francisco, California, US
- Died: April 23, 2013 (aged 85); Pacific Grove, California, US
- Occupation: Industrial designer
- Children: 3

Arnold Wolf (April 30, 1927 – April 23, 2013) was an American industrial designer and principal of Arnold Wolf Associates who was responsible for a number of loudspeaker designs for his client, audio manufacturers JBL. He was its president and chief executive from 1969 to 1980.

== Biography ==
Wolf was born on April 30, 1927, in San Francisco. His father, who was a photographer, took up employment with RKO Pictures in Los Angeles soon after he was born. His family moved to the eastern part of the US in the early 1930s, and settled in New York City. Wolf attended the Bentley School in Manhattan and The Bronx High School of Science, from which he graduated in 1943. In 1942–43, while still a student, he performed as a voice actor in a number of radio network programs. When the family moved to Los Angeles, he found employment at the RKO studio as a draftsman and sketch artist. He left RKO to enrol at Los Angeles City College but left when he was drafted into military service in the air force. Wolf was assigned to Washington, D.C., where he wrote for and was assistant producer of the Air Force Band's weekly national radio program.

After his discharge, he enrolled at UC Berkeley, where he majored in dramatic art, with a minor in historical decorative arts.

== Career ==
After graduation, he became an instructor in theatrical arts at Saint Mary's College of California from 1952 to 1953, and at his alma mater in 1953. In 1955 Wolf started earning his living working in many capacities in a hi-fi shop in Berkeley where he met many early hi-fi pioneers, including Rudy Bozak, Joe Grado and Will Rayment. He partnered with Sargent-Rayment, designing the visuals for their tube electronics. Although the first product was not a commercial success, his later designs gained attention.

=== Industrial designer ===
He set up his own industrial-design practice in Berkeley in 1957. After initially running it out of his own home for three years, he moved it to premises in downtown Berkeley. An early client of Arnold Wolf Associates was James B. Lansing Sound (JBL) in Los Angeles, for whom he designed a number of products. Wolf's first assignment for JBL was a bookshelf loudspeaker project that finally bore the name D42020 'Bel-Aire'. One of Wolf's most celebrated designs was the D44000 Paragon loudspeaker, based on an original concept by Richard Ranger, which instantly became an icon upon its release.

When JBL decided to enter into production of audio electronics to complement its speaker range, Wolf was commissioned to work on the new products. In 1968 Wolf redesigned the JBL company logo, which continues to be in use forty years on.

In 1969, JBL was acquired by the Jervis Corporation (later renamed Harman International), who designated Wolf JBL's new head. Wolf then disengaged from his industrial design practice and moved his family to Hollywood.

=== JBL ===
Amongst the many milestones achieved under his presidency at JBL was the launch of the JBL L100 (nicknamed "Century") loudspeaker with its distinctive grille in 1970. The product, notable for its innovatively coloured and "waffle-pattern" moulded grilles and white-coloured woofers, became the best-selling speaker of the 1970s. Wolf left JBL in 1980, after which he resumed his industrial design practice. In 1984/85 he was professor of design at California State University, Long Beach. He retired from his design practice 1987.

== Death ==
Wolf died on April 23, 2013, in his home in Pacific Grove. He is survived by his two sons and one daughter.
