= Altec Lansing Duplex =

Line of loudspeakers

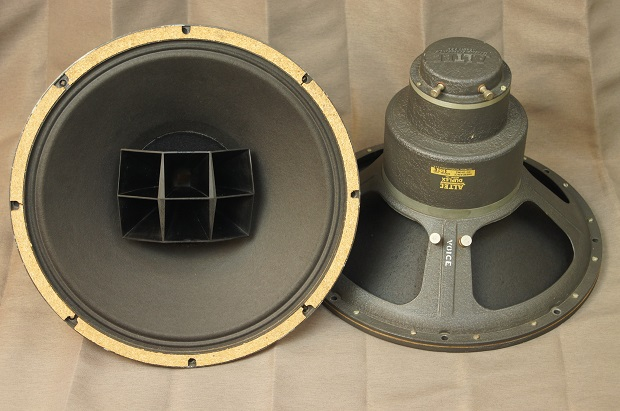
Altec 604 Duplex Loudspeaker

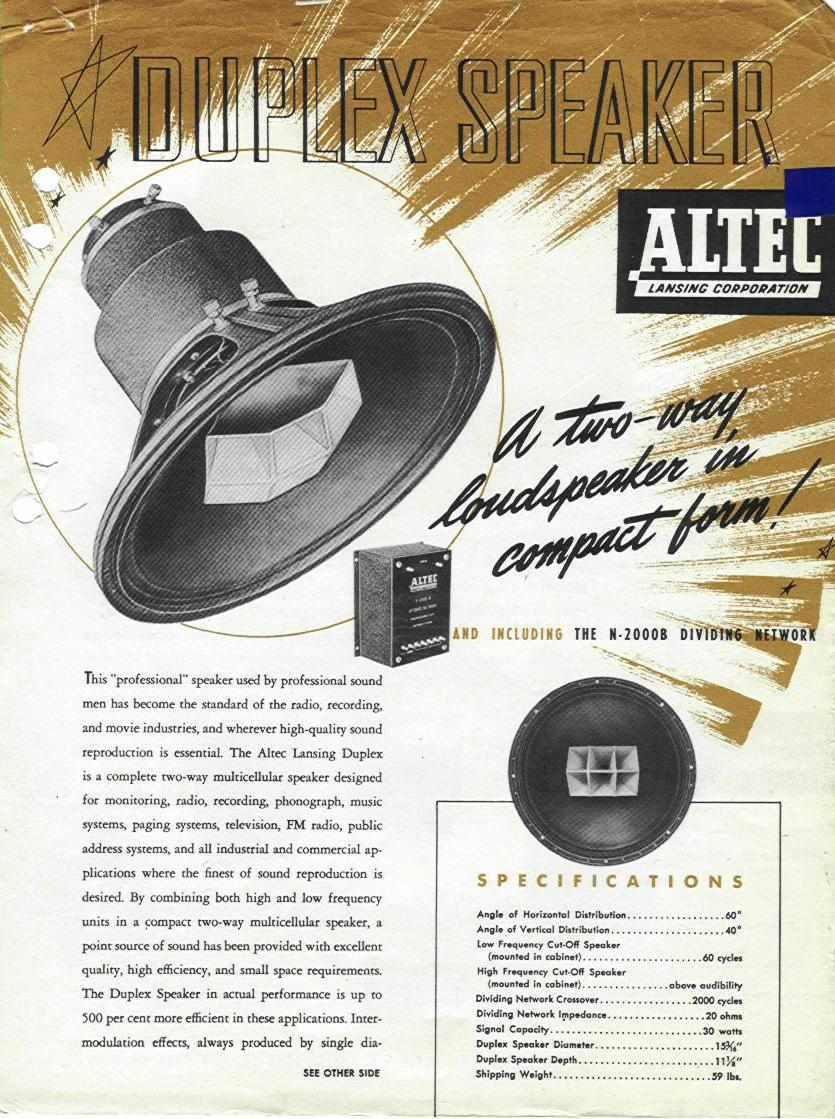
Original Altec 604 Sales Literature, Page 1

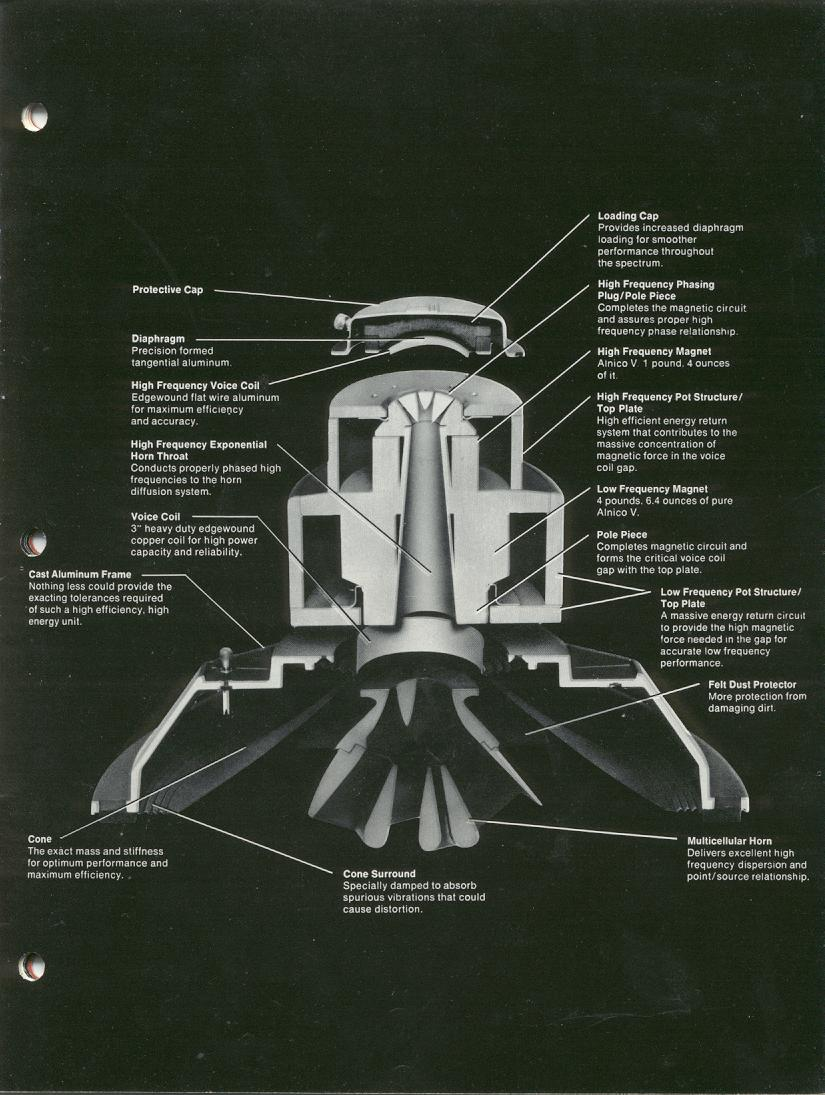
Cutaway View Of Altec 604 Duplex Loudspeaker

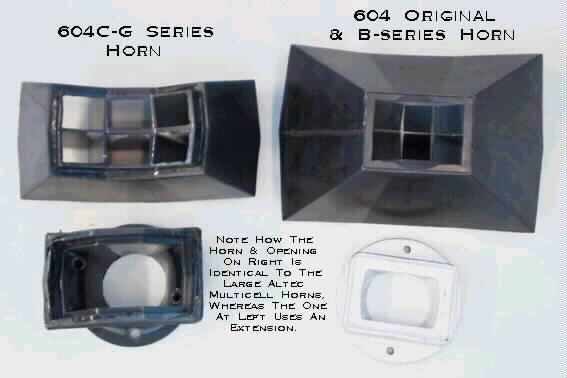
Comparison of the different horns used in the Altec 604 and 604B and the one used in the 604C-G

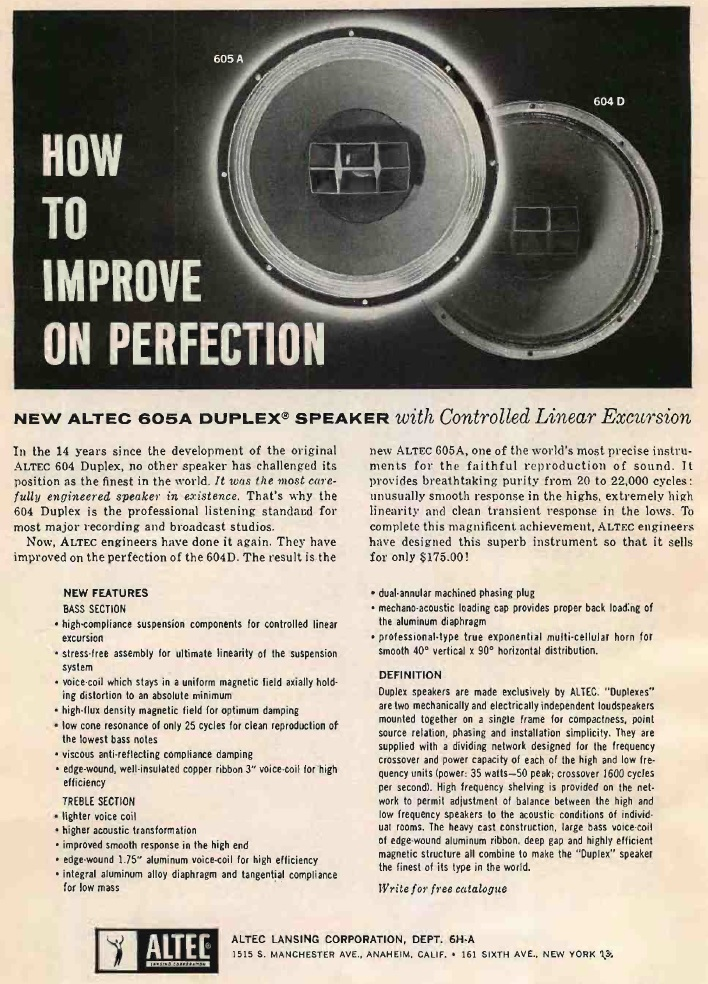
Altec 605A Advertisement, 1959

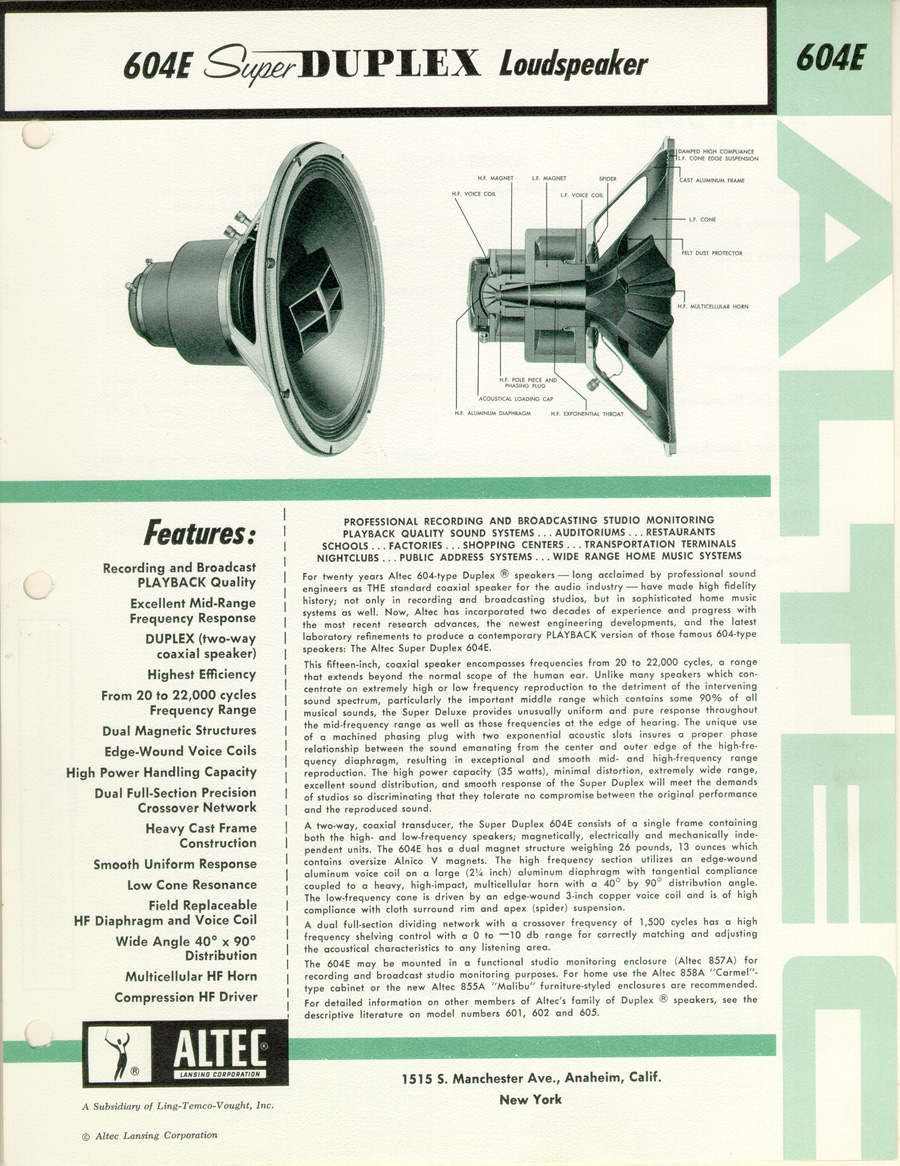
Altec 604E SuperDuplex Specification Sheet, Page 1

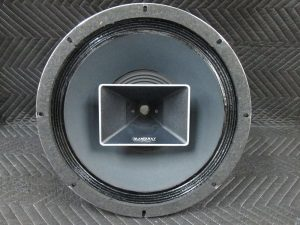
Altec Lansing 604-8K Duplex Loudspeaker

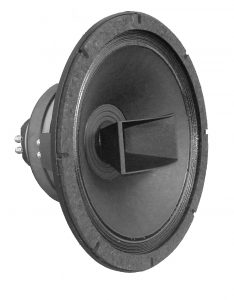
Current version of the Altec 604

DUPLEX was the trade name given by Altec Lansing to its line of coaxial loudspeakers, beginning with the first model 601 in 1943. However, the name was most commonly associated with the subsequent model 604 which was a seminal loudspeaker that became a milestone in loudspeaker development. Well over a dozen different models carried the Duplex name over a near 50-year period. The vast majority consisted of a high frequency (HF) compression driver mounted to the back of a large diameter (12–15 in) paper cone low frequency (LF) driver. However, there were also a few models with small diameter LF cones and direct radiator tweeters.

The Duplex speakers were extremely versatile with the 604 model alone finding application in studio monitoring, home high fidelity, public address, tour sound reinforcement, cinema sound and installed sound. A number of duplex drivers were developed for very specialized applications, such as ceiling speakers. Some of the more significant models in the Duplex lineup were, in order of introduction, the 15" 601, 15" 604, 15" 602, 12" 601, 15" 605, 15" 904 and 12" 920.

The significance of the Duplex loudspeakers is evidenced by the fact that the Altec Lansing 604 Duplex was inducted into the TECnology Hall of Fame in 2005.

== Altec 601 ==
The path to the Duplex line started with the acquisition of the Lansing Manufacturing Company (LMCO) in 1941 by the All Technical Products Company. At that time, the company name was shortened to "Altec" and "Lansing" was added at the same time, creating Altec Lansing, commonly called, simply, "Altec". That acquisition brought Altec into the loudspeaker manufacturing business and brought the loudspeaker manufacturing capabilities of its principal, James B. Lansing. Shortly after that, Altec was approached by one of its dealers, named Art Crawford, with a request to develop a compact loudspeaker. Crawford was a high-end audio dealer in Los Angeles at the time, and he felt that there was a viable market for a high-quality loudspeaker that was small enough to be used in home audio systems. The current two-way speakers with separate LF and HF drivers were too large for this application and Art suggested a coaxial design whereby a LF and HF driver could be combined into one unit. Altec's president and owner, George Carrington, Sr., saw the merit of this concept. Carrington, an audio engineer himself, designed the prototype, assisted by John Hilliard, who did the crossover design, and Jim Lansing, who developed the tooling for the project and supervised its construction.

By 1943, a prototype was rapidly developed with off-the-shelf LMCO components. The LF portion of the driver was developed by taking the field coil motor from the LMCO 287 compression driver and using it to drive the cone from one of LMCO's 15-inch LF drivers with a 2-inch voice coil. Both were mounted on a stamped steel frame. An LMCO 801 field coil compression driver with a 1.75-inch diaphragm was used as-is for HF reproduction and mounted coaxially to the back of the 287 motor. A horn throat from the 801 penetrated the center of the LF field coil and exited into a small multicellular horn mounted in front of the LF cone. The horn was designed with a cut-off frequency of 900 Hz and the system was set with a crossover frequency of 1200 Hz.

The prototype confirmed the concept and went into production in 1943 as the model 601 Duplex, but it was not long-lived. In less than a year, a significant redesign was underway to substantially improve the driver. The primary motivation was to replace the field coil motors with permanent magnet motors. Field coils are very powerful allowing for very efficient loudspeakers. However, they require an external power supply which greatly limits their areas of application.

When the 601 was first designed, there were no commercially available permanent magnets that could cost effectively provide the same level of magnetic energy as a field coil. During WWII, Altec was involved in developing submarine detection equipment for the Marine Airborne Detection program. It was through this that they were introduced to a new type of permanent magnetic material; Alnico V. This was much stronger than any other permanent magnet at the time. In 1944, they used this technology to create a permanent magnet version of the 601 the which became the famous 604.

There has been much confusion about the original 601 due to the fact that very few were made, with almost no survivors, and because the model name was re-used in the 1950s for a completely different Altec Lansing Duplex driver. The 1950s version of the 601 was a 12" diameter coaxial speaker with a miniature HF compression driver mounted within the motor of the LF driver using permanent magnets. This confusion was exacerbated in 1988 when Altec Lansing misidentified the later 12" 601 as the original 601 in their own promotional literature celebrating their 50th anniversary. That mistake was carried forth for years in subsequent Altec Lansing literature. However, at least one original field coil 601 is known to exist (S/N 150) and has been confirmed as a 15" model. In addition, copies of the original sales literature exist that accurately describe it.

== Altec 604 ==
The permanent magnet upgrade of the 601 was released in 1944 as the 604, at which point the 601 was discontinued. The 604 was the same basic design using a 15-inch LF driver, but with a larger 3" voice coil, individual Alnico V magnets for the LF and HF drivers, and a cast aluminum frame.

When making the horn for the 601/604, it had to be designed so the sound coming from it would not interfere with the sound from the bass driver. To overcome this, a 2×3 multicellular design with a dispersion of 40°×90° was used. This allowed the sound to leave the horn and be dispersed largely without coming into contact with the cone of the bass driver. The backside of the horn, which faced the LF cone, was also coated with a damping compound to reduce high frequency reflections off of it. The first 604 had a crossover frequency of 2000 Hz. It was moved down to 1500 hz .

Both the 601 and the first 604 had a frequency response of 60 Hz to 16 kHz with a power rating of only 25 watts, relatively low but acceptable due to the speakers' efficiency. As amplifiers of the time did not produce much power, the speakers had to be extremely efficient to produce adequate loudness. The next speaker in the 604 line to be released was the 604B, with a slightly higher power handling at 30 watts and a better frequency response ranging from 30 Hz to 16 kHz. Also, this speaker had a lower crossover frequency of 1000 Hz.

Following the 604B came the 604C. Again, the power handling capacity and frequency response were increased to 35 watts and 30 Hz to 22 kHz, respectively. The 604C was the first version of the 604 to use the redesigned HF horn. Alexis Badmaieff, head of acoustic engineering at Altec at the time, changed the horn design from a true multicellular type to what was really a sectoral horn with "fins" inside the bell flare. The fins did not go all the way back to the opening of the throat of the horn, as did the previous design. A young Paul S. Veneklasen, who was working in the acoustic research department at Altec at the time, objected to the change, claiming that it was done to save money, not because it was an acoustical improvement. His protestations went unheeded and the sectoral horn with the "fins", or as some called them, "vanes", remained in use in the 604, starting with the "C" version and continuing through the "G".

Following the 604C came the short-lived 604D, which was soon replaced with the 605A. The 605A was supposed to be an improvement over the 604, but it was poorly received, partly because it was an attempt to make it cheaper to build the 604, but mostly because the name, "604", had become a widely recognized industry standard, and people didn't WANT a 605 – they wanted a 604. So, Altec relented and released the 604E SuperDuplex.

The 604-8G was next, and was released in 1973. It was produced until 1979, and was the last using the "C-style HF horn. The power handling capacity was substantially increased to 65 watts and the frequency response was improved, bringing the bass response down to 20 Hz and treble response up to 22 kHz.

The next big step in the 604 family was the 604-8K, which was similar in most respects to the 604-8G, but used a ferrite magnet instead of an Alnico V magnet. Ferrite magnets are much more resistant to being demagnetized and are thus more robust. However, debate continues to this day as to the sonic superiority of Alnico V vs ferrite magnetic motors as it relates to freedom from distortion. Also, the 604-8K used a new HF horn design based on Altec's new, patented MANTARAY series of horns, rather than the multicellular horn design of the older models. It also used Altec's new TANGERINE radial phasing plug, which greatly improved the HF performance. The Mantaray horn was a marked improvement over the C-G HF horn, but still did not have the dispersion qualities and low-frequency loading of the original multicellular horn.

The 604 achieved its greatest fame as a recording studio monitor. Its compact size, wide bandwidth, high output and point source topology made it an ideal choice for the needs of the new tape recording technology introduced in the late '40s and early '50s. Prior to tape recorders, commercial recordings were cut directly to a master disk, nominally in one take with no real provision for editing. As a result, monitoring needs were very rudimentary and mainly regarded monitoring for technical defects.

In contrast, the tape recorder ushered in editing, overdubbing and ultimately multi-track recording and stereo output. There was the continuing need to critically listen to recordings long after the performance was captured to accommodate the substantial post processing now required to develop a final master tape. At the time, the 604 was unequalled in this application, given the significant increase in accuracy it presented over the competition. As a result, it became ubiquitous in North American recording studios for the next two decades. In the 1970s it was overtaken by competition, primarily from JBL. However, later that same decade, it would have a resurgence that lasted well into the 1980s when UREI introduced their 813 studio monitor that incorporated a modified 604 driver with a time-aligned cross-over. For a time, the 813 was nearly as ubiquitous as the original 604.

== Altec 904 ==
Shortly after the introduction of the 604-8K, Altec released the 904-8A, which was basically a high powered 604-8K that could handle up to 150 watts. Both remained in production until the shutdown of Altec Lansing Professional by its then owners, Telex Communications, in 1998.

== Current manufacture ==
In 1998, Altec Lansing was closed by its parent company, Telex Corporation. At that time, William Hanushak, who worked for Altec in the manufacture and design of loudspeakers, purchased the tooling and rights to manufacture parts and products formerly produced by Altec Lansing, including the 604-series. For a while, his company, Great Plains Audio, produced the 604-8K. However, dissatisfied with the MANTARAY horn, Bill began working on a new version of the 604 – the 604-8H. The 604-8H featured the horn used on the UREI version of the 604 in the '70s, minus the blue foam, which, after testing, was found unnecessary. The current version is the 604-8H-III, and an Alnico version with the true multicellular horn is available by special order.
