= John Kenneth Hilliard =

American engineer

- Hilliard in the 1950s
- Born: October 1901; Wyndmere, North Dakota, U.S.
- Died: March 21, 1989 (aged 87)
- Occupation(s): Engineer, designer, researcher, consultant
- Employer(s): United Artists, Metro-Goldwyn-Mayer, Altec Lansing, LTV, J.K.Hilliard and Associates
- Spouse: Jessamine Hilliard

John Kenneth Hilliard (October 1901 – March 21, 1989) was an American acoustical and electrical engineer who pioneered several important loudspeaker concepts and designs. He helped develop the practical use of recorded sound for film and won an Academy Award in 1935. Hilliard designed movie theater sound systems and worked on radar and submarine detection equipment during World War II. He collaborated with James B. "Jim" Lansing to create the long-lived Altec Voice of the Theatre speaker system.

Hilliard conducted research on high-intensity acoustics, vibration, miniaturization, and long-line communications for NASA and the U.S. Air Force. Toward the end of his career, he helped standardize noise-control criteria for home construction in California, a model that has since been applied to new homes throughout the United States.

== Education ==
Born in October 1901 in Wyndmere, North Dakota, Hilliard received his B.S. degree from Hamline University in St. Paul, Minnesota at 24 years of age. He then obtained a B.S.E.E. at the University of Minnesota. He married a laboratory biologist and began working toward a master's degree.

== Movie sound ==
=== United Artists ===
After the release of The Jazz Singer, all the major film companies were racing to hire audio engineers so they could record and reproduce sound for film. Through common acquaintances at Electrical Research Products, Inc. (ERPI) within Western Electric, Hilliard was contacted and hired by United Artists Studios (UA) in Hollywood, California in 1928 because of his studies in physics, engineering and acoustics. Having left his Masters studies behind in Minnesota, Hilliard, not yet 28 years old, supervised all sound recording for Coquette, UA's first talking motion picture. Western Electric provided recording equipment, but the specific techniques for achieving the best sound on film had to be developed by hard work and imagination. Hilliard's ground-breaking methods later became industry standards.

=== MGM ===
In 1933, MGM hired Hilliard away from UA. His first assignment was to fix their problematic recording amplifiers whose overall phase shift measured out to a voice-distorting 1500 degrees. Hilliard's solution was to use higher linearity transformers obtained from Lansing Manufacturing Company, in consultation with founder Jim Lansing. Earlier, Hilliard had befriended a laboratory associate of his wife's, Dr. John Blackburn, and in 1934, he helped Blackburn get a position as a design engineer at Lansing Manufacturing. The following year, Hilliard and his team at MGM solved the problem of recording Nelson Eddy's strong operatic baritone alongside Jeanette MacDonald's flat and weak soprano voice, picking up an Academy Award for Sound Recording on the duo's first film together: Naughty Marietta.

As part of his work to reduce the weight of sound equipment at MGM, Hilliard approached James "Jim" Cannon of Cannon Electric in Los Angeles regarding the machining of a smaller, lighter version of Cannon's heavy-duty electrical connectors that Western Electric had been using for motors and microphones. The resulting lightweight six-pin Cannon connector eventually evolved to become the industry standard three-pin connector for microphones; the XLR connector. Though the Great Depression was underway, Cannon Electric was kept very busy producing the popular connectors for film studios.

While at MGM, Hilliard was asked by Gordon Mitchell to chair the Motion Picture Research Council's sound committee. Hilliard's first task was standardizing a uniform method of reproducing film sound in the theater. He began by standardizing recording techniques among eight major film studios. Later, with Harry Kimball, he helped develop the 1938 "Academy Curve", a standard filter that attenuated recorded noise above 2,000 Hz while retaining prominent voice reproduction characteristics.

=== Shearer Horn System ===
Hilliard's continued contact with Lansing and Blackburn led to a conversation about the poor state of loudspeakers in movie theaters. The three men shared ideas about how best to improve existing designs. Hilliard took his plans to MGM's head of sound, Douglas Shearer (brother of Norma Shearer), who decided to fund the effort. Hilliard was made responsible for the concept and design of the project. Lansing Manufacturing was tapped to develop the drive units while Hilliard worked to improve the electronic components. What came out of this collaboration was a well-received industry-standard loudspeaker system, "The Shearer Horn System for Theatres" (1937), that garnered a technical award "Oscar" for sound from the Academy of Motion Picture Arts and Sciences.

In May 1941, Lansing Manufacturing was bought by All Technical Services Company, an outgrowth of Western Electric's ERPI division which had become independent. The resulting company, with the established film industry contacts of ERPI combined with the extended manufacturing capability of Lansing, reformed as Altec Lansing. Hilliard had contacts in both parent firms.

=== World War II intervenes ===
In 1942 when the United States was preparing to fight a long, technically challenging war, Hilliard left MGM to join his friend Blackburn who had begun research for Massachusetts Institute of Technology (MIT) to work on radar development for U.S. military applications. His work at MIT in Cambridge, Massachusetts led in 1943 to an employment opportunity back in Los Angeles at Altec Lansing, where he improved their Magnetic Anomaly Detector (MAD, also known as "Magnetic Airborne Detection") system for Anti-submarine warfare (ASW).

=== Voice of the Theatre ===
In 1944, Hilliard returned to entertainment acoustics with Altec Lansing. Improving on the Shearer Horn System, Hilliard worked with Jim Lansing and Blackie Blackburn to develop the loudspeaker system of the 20th century: the Voice of the Theatre (VOTT). Arriving in the marketplace in 1945, it offered better coherence and clarity at high power levels. The Academy of Motion Picture Arts and Sciences immediately began testing its sonic characteristics; they made it the movie theater industry-standard in 1955. Production of the long-lived VOTT continued into the 1990s.

== Altec ==
In 1946, Hilliard took over as vice president of engineering due to Jim Lansing's leaving Altec to start a new enterprise which would become JBL. Hilliard remained VP of Engineering at Altec until 1960 during which time he supervised the development of sectoral horns, significant reductions in the size of the condenser microphone, many amplifier and crossover designs, and a major reworking and improvement of the Altec Lansing Duplex 604, the well-known high-fidelity coaxial loudspeaker driver originally designed by George Carrington, Sr., who was then president of Altec Lansing.

As chief engineer at Altec, Hilliard joined the Hollywood section of the Sapphire Group, a regular social gathering of sound recordists and a precursor to the Audio Engineering Society. In 1948, Hilliard was elected to chair the Sapphire Group Recording Standards Committee. He made certain, along with the Motion Picture Research Council, that proposed industry standards were forwarded to members of National Association of Broadcasters (NAB), Institute of Radio Engineers (IRE), Acoustical Society of America (ASA) and Royal Musical Association (RMA). Hilliard helped form the Los Angeles section of the Audio Engineering Society (AES) in 1951. At the beginning of 1963, IRE merged with the American Institute of Electrical Engineers (AIEE) to form the Institute of Electrical and Electronics Engineers (IEEE)—Hilliard retained his Fellowship.

== Noise studies ==
In 1960, Hilliard became director of the Ling-Temco-Vought (LTV) Western Research Center where he widened his scope of research to include the study of sonic booms, missile launch noise, atmospheric noise refraction, highway noise mitigation, hearing conservation and gun silencing. He helped develop an air-driven noise generator that produced 10,000 acoustic watts and was driven by a 300 horsepower (220 kW) diesel engine. He helped NASA with voice communication equipment including long lines between Cape Canaveral and Houston as well as assisting the Air Force with their worldwide telephone system. He worked on military listening systems. In 1968, Hilliard retired from regular employment at LTV, continuing to work with LTV as a consultant but in the same manner as if he hadn't retired. In the early 1970s, Hilliard directed the hearing conservation program at Bio-Medical Engineering Corporation. He founded J.K.Hilliard and Associates in the mid-1970s, performing architectural acoustic analysis and creating the standards for California's multi-family housing construction acoustic design policies, significantly influencing interior and exterior noise-control standards for homeowners across the United States.

== Personal life ==
While he was undertaking his post-graduate studies in Minnesota, Hilliard married Jessamine Hilliard, a published researcher in the fields of allergies, enzymes, hormones and radiology. She accompanied him to California when UA offered him a job. In 1932, she introduced Hilliard to a young electrical engineer working at her Los Angeles laboratory, a doctoral graduate fresh out of Caltech: Dr. John "Blackie" Blackburn, a man Hilliard would continue to associate and collaborate with in many technical endeavors.

Hilliard ceased consulting in 1985 and died on March 21, 1989. Friends said he helped lay out a loudspeaker sales demonstration booth just months before he died.

== Published works ==
- (1936) "A Study of Theater Loud Speakers and the Resultant Development of the Shearer Two-Way Horn System". Journal of the Society of Motion Picture Engineers, Volume 27, p. 45
- (1938) "Motion Picture Sound Engineering". Academy of Motion Picture Arts and Sciences, Los Angeles.
- (1940) "Use of Fine Grain Positive Emulsions for Variable Density Film Recording". Journal of the Society of Motion Picture Engineers, pp. 535–537, 564
- (1957) Acoustic Society of America: "Generation of High-Intensity Sound Using Loudspeakers for Environmental Testing of Electronic Components"
- (1957) "Instrumentation for the Measurement and Generation of High Intensity Sound", with Leo Beranek. Defense Technical Information Center
- (1962) "Electro-Pneumatic Air Modulator for Fog Signals", IRE Trans. Audio
- (1965) AES Journal Article Database: "High-Power, Low-Frequency Loudspeakers"
- (1966) AES Journal Article Database: "Development of Horn-Type Moving Coil Driver Unit"
- (1969) Audio Engineering Society Electronic Library: "An Improved Theatre Type Loudspeaker System"
- (1970) AES Journal Article Database: "Unbaffled Loudspeaker Column Arrays"
- (1971) Audio Engineering Society Electronic Library: "Microphone Windscreens"
- (1971) Audio Engineering Society Electronic Library: "Airport Noise Management"
- (1976) Audio Engineering Society Electronic Library: "Historical review of horns used for audience-type sound reproduction"
- (1977) Audio Engineering Society Electronic Library: "A Review of Early Developments in Electroacoustics in the U.S.A."
- (1978) AES Journal Article Database: "Dividing Networks for Loud Speaker Systems"
- (1978) AES Journal Article Database: "The Function and Design of Horns for Loudspeakers"
- (1978) Audio Engineering Society Electronic Library: "A Study of Theatre Loud Speakers and the Resultant Development of the Shearer Two-Way Horn System"
- (1980) AES Journal Article Database: "The Practical Application of Time-Delay Spectrometry in the Field"
- (1984) Audio Engineering Society Electronic Library: "A Brief History of Early Motion Picture Sound Recording and Reproducing Practices"

== Awards ==
- (1935) Academy Award for Best Sound Recording on the film Naughty Marietta
- (1937) Technical award from the Academy for the Shearer Horn
- (1951) Honorary Doctorate from the University of Hollywood
- (1961) John H. Potts Award (now the Gold Medal), the highest accolade from the Audio Engineering Society
- (1962) Technical Achievement Award, IRE Signal Processing Society
