= Sparkomatic =

Defunct car audio equipment manufacturer

Sparkomatic Corporation
- Company type: Private
- Industry: Audio electronics
- Founded: 1953
- Defunct: 2000
- Headquarters: Milford, Pennsylvania, United States
- Key people: Jonas Anchel (Founder & CEO) Edward Anchel (later owner/son)
- Products: Consumer loudspeakers, car audio

Sparkomatic was a US-based manufacturer of car audio products with a production facility in Milford, Pennsylvania. Their primary products were automotive speakers, tape players, radios, and other audio accessories.

== History ==
Originally incorporated in 1953 as Sparkomatic Corporation, it first operated primarily as a local wholesale distributor of automobile aftermarket parts. By 1961 the company began to sell products with their own Spark-O-Matic brand name. The product line included aftermarket car transmission shifters and related automotive accessories such as tachometers and oil gauges. In 1968 the company branched into car audio accessories with a line of FM car radios, speakers and related accessories. Cars in the US were sold with only AM radio as standard equipment until the late 1980s, and FM radio and cassette players were optional. By the mid-1970s the company had become known for their car audio products and accessories, though they continued to sell other non-audio accessories for a short time longer.

Sparkomatic was at that time primarily a producer of low to mid-range car audio products, as well as adapters to convert an 8 track player into a quadrophonic unit. By the latter half of the 1970s, they expanded into other car-related accessories such as digital dashboard clocks and CB radios. A few years later they attempted a foray into high-end car audio, branded as Amplidyne. By the latter half of the 1980s, their automobile accessories were folded into a new brand called “Kenco”, and by the early 1990s they exited the market segment.

In the early 1990s, the company entered the home audio market and created the brand Sennet (or “Sennet Concepts”). In addition to being used on audio and home theatre speakers, this was also used on car audio speakers that were marketed in a segment a step above Sparkomatic. The brand was not successful and was discontinued. The company continued in the home audio business, using the original brand.

In 1992 the company decided to purchase Altec Lansing from Telex. The Sparkomatic brand lacked cachet as it was primarily sold at discount chain K-Mart, hence the acquisition of Altec Lansing boosted the company's reputation. In 1992 Altec Lansing moved to Sparkomatic Milford headquarters, and began building a new line of car and home loudspeakers. The home loudspeakers had solid-walnut cabinets which were sourced locally in Pennsylvania. Altec Lansing was one of the only companies at the time to build its own cabinets and develop and build its own drive units, all under one roof. In 1998 Altec Lansing introduced the first sound bar/subwoofer system called Voice of the Digital Theatre but had no further models.

In 2000 the Altec Lansing and Sparkomatic merged under the Altec Lansing name. The name Sparkomatic was discontinued.
