= Bart N. Locanthi =

American audio engineer

- Born: Bartholomew Nicholas Locanthi II; 1919; White Plains, New York, U.S.
- Died: January 9, 1994 (aged 74–75); Glendale, California, U.S.
- Education: California Institute of Technology (BS)
- Occupation: Audio engineer
- Spouse: Dorothy Nell Davis (m. 1943)
- Children: 3

Bartholomew Nicholas Locanthi II (White Plains, New York, 1919 – Glendale, California, January 9, 1994) was an audio engineer and leading expert in the US pro-audio industry in the 1970s and 1980s.

== Education ==
Bart Locanthi graduated from California Institute of Technology in 1947 with a B.S. degree in physics.

== Career ==
From 1947–1960, he mostly contributed to analog computers.

Locanthi became the Vice President of Engineering at JBL in 1960.

In the late 1960s, he developed the "T circuit", an output configuration for solid-state power amplifiers that became a standard in the industry. He received three US patents for his pioneering work on transistor amplifiers.

In 1975, he was named a Vice President of Pioneer North America Development. While at Pioneer, he and his team of engineers designed the HPM-100 loudspeaker. It was also at Pioneer that he was deeply involved in digital development during the early years of the compact disc.

Bart Locanthi was a Fellow of the Acoustical Society of America and the Audio Engineering Society (AES); he was awarded posthumously the AES Gold Medal in 1996. Locanthi was active in many AES affairs, he served as papers chairman for conventions, member of the Board of Governors, and served as president (1986–1987).

== Personal life ==
Locanthi married astronomer Dorothy N. Davis in 1943. They had two daughters and a son. He died on January 9, 1994, in Glendale, California, after a long battle with pancreatic cancer.
