= Altec Lansing =

American audio equipment manufacturer

Altec Lansing, Inc.
- Logo as of 2016
- Type: Private
- Industry: Audio electronics
- Founded: 1927; 99 years ago
- Founder: Alvis Ward
- Headquarters: 195 Carter Drive, Edison, NJ, United States
- Key people: Ralph Sasson COO, Stefan Betesh SVP
- Products: Consumer loudspeakers, headphones, in-ear monitors
- Owners: Sakar International
- Website: alteclansing.com

Altec Lansing, Inc. is an American audio electronics company founded in 1927. Their primary products are loudspeakers and associated audio electronics for professional, home, automotive and multimedia applications.

Engineers at Western Electric, who later formed Altec Services Company, developed the technology for motion picture sound that was introduced in 1927, with the release of The Jazz Singer.

Originally, Altec Services Company serviced the theater sound systems the company founders had helped develop. In 1941, the Altec Services Company purchased the nearly bankrupt Lansing Manufacturing Company and melded the two names, forming the Altec Lansing Corporation, and with the manufacturing capabilities of the former Lansing Manufacturing Company, they quickly expanded into manufacturing horn loudspeakers.

In 1958 the Altec Lansing Corporation was purchased by James Ling who made it part of LTV Ling Altec. LTV spun off Altec which it loaded down with debt first. By 1974, the company was saddled with debt. It was reorganized under Chapter 11 as Altec Corporation and continued for 10 years. Altec filed a second bankruptcy. In 1984, Gulton Industries purchased the brand out of Chapter 11 bankruptcy. Gulton was acquired by Mark IV Audio. Since then, there has been a string of owners, purchased in 1986 by Sparkomatic, with the Pro equipment still made by Mark IV Audio, Mark IV sold out to Telex, who closed down the Pro division and folded its products into Electro-Voice. In 2005 Altec Lansing Technologies was acquired by Plantronics, 2009 bought by Prophet Equity, and has been owned since 2012 by the Infinity Group, a company which acquires struggling companies.

Popular loudspeakers included the Altec Lansing Duplex 600-series coaxial loudspeaker, studio monitors from the 1940s to the 1980s, and the Altec "Voice of the Theatre" line of loudspeakers widely used in movie theaters, concert halls, and also in rock concerts from the 1960s to the 1990s, such as custom designs used at Woodstock Festival.

== History ==
=== Conception and early products ===
In 1930 AT&T's Western Electric established a division to install and service loudspeakers and electronic products for motion-picture use. Named Electrical Research Products, Inc. and commonly referred to by the acronym ERPI, it became the target of an anti-trust suit brought by Stanley K. Oldden. By 1936, Western Electric had shed its audio-equipment manufacturing and sales division, bought by International Projector and Motiograph, and was looking to dissolve the associated service division. ERPI was purchased as part of a consent decree in 1937 by a group of ERPI executives, including George Carrington Sr., Leon Whitney "Mike" Conrow, Bert Sanford Jr., and Alvis A. Ward, with funding from three Wall Street investors. They reincorporated as "Altec Service Company", the "Altec" standing for "all technical". Company executives promised they would never make or sell audio equipment.

The Altec Services Company purchased the bankrupt Lansing Manufacturing Company and melded the two names, forming the Altec Lansing Corporation on May 1, 1941. The first Altec Lansing power amplifier, Model 142B, was produced that same year. James Bullough Lansing worked for Altec Lansing, then in 1946 he left to found the James B. Lansing Company (JBL), another manufacturer of high-quality professional loudspeakers, which competed with Altec Lansing. Altec Lansing produced a line of professional and high-fidelity audio equipment, starting with a line of horn-based loudspeaker systems. First developed for use in motion-picture theaters, these products were touted for their fidelity, efficiency and high sound-level capability. Products included "biflex" speakers (where frequency range was increased by a flexible "decoupling" of a small center area of the speaker's cone from a larger "woofer" area) and the 604-series of coaxial speakers (which employed a high-efficiency compression driver mounted to the rear of the 604's low-frequency magnet, and exited through a multicellular horn that passed through center of the woofer's cone).

Altec Lansing also made the Voice of the Theatre systems. The design resulted from a collaboration between John Hilliard and Jim Lansing. Douglas Shearer didn't hesitate to approve the Hilliard's proposal and authorized "any reasonable budget". Hilliard became the team leader of this new project. Hilliard immediately recruited Lansing Manufacturing, Robert Stephens, a design draftsman on MGM's staff, and Harry Kimball. The speaker was named the Shearer horn. Later on, a more refined model, the VOTT, was introduced. The smallest model, the A-7, used a large-sized sectoral metal horn for high frequencies, which featured dividers (sectors) to provide control sound dispersion, plus a medium-sized wooden low-frequency enclosure, which functioned as a hybrid bass-horn/bass-reflex enclosure.

The most often used Voice of the Theatre system was the A-4, many of which are still in use in motion picture theaters measuring 9 feet tall . as of 2018. The efficiency of all of these products originally provided high sound pressure levels from the limited amplifier power available at the time. The original Voice of the Theatre series included the A-1, A-2, A-4, and the A-5. The A-7 and A-8 were designed for smaller venues. In 2004, the A-7 Voice of the Theatre system was inducted into the TECnology Hall of Fame, an honor given to "products and innovations that have had an enduring impact on the development of audio technology."

Bill Hanley used Altec high frequency drivers and horns along with JBL bass drivers in his custom-built loudspeaker system for the Woodstock Festival in 1969. Some professional Altec Lansing products remained in use well into the 1990s.

=== Altec Service Co. and Altec Lansing Professional audio products ===
James Ling purchased the Altec Lansing Corporation from the ailing George Carrington Sr., in 1958. By the time James Ling spun Altec Lansing off in 1974, his company, LTV-Ling-Altec, had heavy debts. In 1984, Gulton Industries, Inc., purchased the Altec Sound Products Division from the Altec Lansing Corporation, which was operating under Chapter 11 of the U.S. Bankruptcy Code. Included with the purchase were the tooling, parts and product inventories, distributor network, designs, patents, and assets of the Sound Products Division of Altec Lansing. The motion picture theater sound installation and repair business, Altec Service Co., was sold to J. Bruce Waddell, then head of Altec Service, and comptroller Robert V. Gandolfi. They established it as A.S.C. Technical Services in Richardson, Texas.

The Altec Lansing Corporation was formed by Gulton Industries as part of the purchase and headquartered in Oklahoma City, the site of the University Sound factory built by Jimmy Ling when he moved there from White Plains, New York. Prior to the purchase, Altec Lansing had been headquartered in Yorba Linda, California, but it was moved as part of an effort to reduce operating costs.

Altec Lansing Corporation produced professional audio products until 1995, when Telex Communications, who had purchased Altec Lansing's parent company, EVI Audio, Inc., in 1997, consolidated all of their electronics manufacturing facilities into one location in Minnesota.

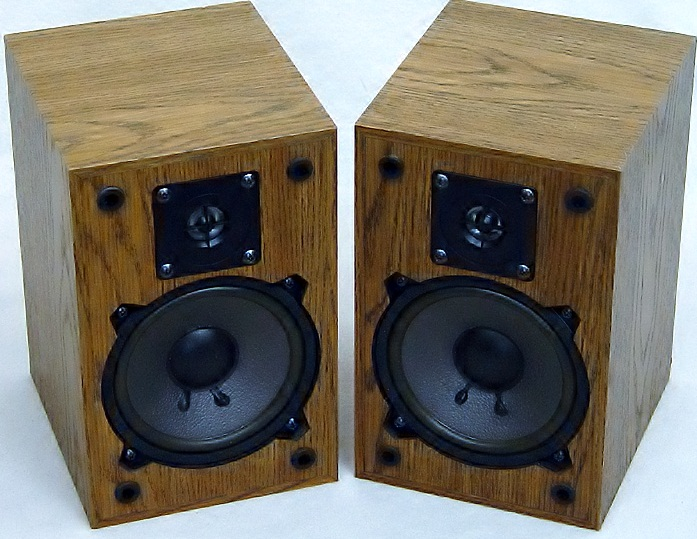
Altec Lansing Bookshelf loudspeakers

=== Post-1996 ===
In 1996, Altec Lansing Technologies Multimedia established an R&D center in Kfar Saba, Israel. The center, known as ALST Technical Excellence Center, cooperate with STMicroelectronics (ALST = Altec Lansing + STMicro) and focused on advanced multimedia technologies such as USB audio, surround sound and wireless audio as well as on handheld video. The center was closed in 2001 and the development activities moved to the Milford headquarters. In May 2000, Altec Lansing's Professional division was closed by Telex and the Altec Lansing was later sold to Sparkomatic and renamed Altec Lansing Technologies. The Altec Lansing Professional line was relaunched in April 2002 by Altec Lansing Technologies using a few former executives and sound engineers of the old Oklahoma City-based Altec Lansing Corporation, bringing Altec's professional and consumer products under the same roof for the first time since 1986. The company later dropped the professional audio products and Altec Lansing Professional's Oklahoma City offices were closed in late 2006 and all remaining activities relocated to the headquarters in Milford, Pennsylvania.

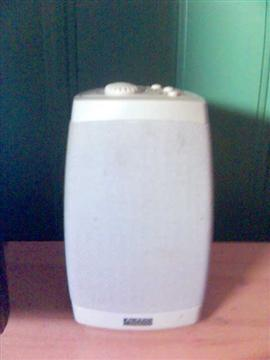
An Altec Lansing PC speaker

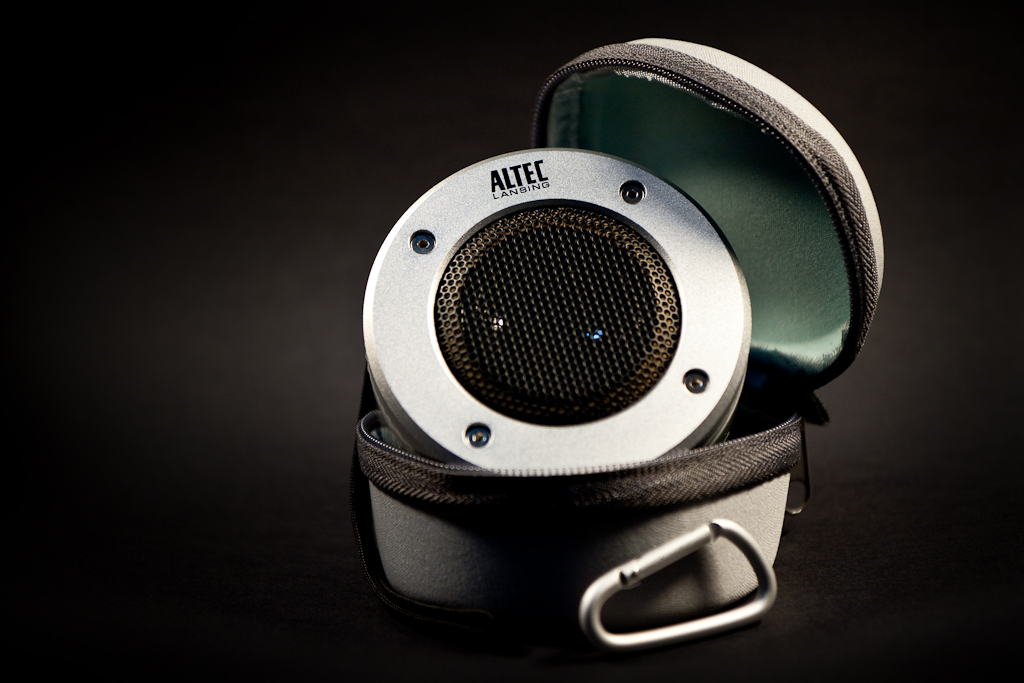
An Altec Lansing iM227 speaker from the Orbit M series

On 30 April 2001 Altec Lansing Technologies launched their first line of headphones named as the AHP series. This series of headphones had various different designs and price ranges. In February 2004, Altec Lansing Technologies reissued a number of loudspeakers starting with the A7 Voice of the Theatre, manufactured in the US with some changes to the enclosure. Similarly, Altec Lansing Technologies reissued the 510, 508 and 305 loudspeakers. Very few were actually made. On July 11, 2005, Altec Lansing Technologies announced that it was to be acquired by Plantronics for approximately $166 million. On September 10, 2008, Altec Lansing Technologies went through a corporate makeover changing its name to Altec Lansing LLC and its logo from a "whirlpool" to an abstraction of a multi-cellular horn.

On 1 October 2009 Altec Lansing LLC announced that it was to be acquired by Prophet Equity for approximately 18 million dollars. In July 2011, Altec Lansing LLC announced the opening of new West Coast headquarters in San Diego, California. Brendon Stead joined as Vice President of Product Management and Engineering. Stead was formerly the General Manager and Vice President of Harman International and Labtec. On October 18, 2012, The Infinity Group bought Altec Lansing for $17.5 million at auction thus saving the company from bankruptcy. Infinity specializes in acquiring and turning around struggling or bankrupt consumer brands.
