= Dorothy Davis Locanthi =

American astronomer

- Dorothy N. Davis, from a 1933 newspaper
- Born: Dorothy Nell Davis; April 19, 1913; East St. Louis, Illinois
- Died: September 27, 1999 (aged 86); Glendale, California
- Occupation: Astronomer

Dorothy Nell Davis Locanthi (April 19, 1913 – September 27, 1999) was an American astronomer.

== Early life ==
Dorothy Nell Davis Locanthi (née Davis) was born in East St. Louis, Illinois, the daughter of Gordon Z. Davis and Nellie Thoma Davis. She was an athletic teen; her height (over six feet) was an advantage in her field event, the standing broad jump.

She graduated from high school at age 15. She attended Vassar College, where she majored in physics and took astronomy courses from Caroline Furness and Maud Makemson. She graduated from Vassar in 1933. Locanthi taught at Mills College in Oakland for a year, accessing Lick Observatory and the University of California, Berkeley, and earned a master's degree. Her master’s thesis was on S-Type long period variables. She pursued doctoral studies at the University of California and worked with C. Donald Shane there. She was awarded a Lick Observatory Fellowship in 1936, and completed her dissertation on the spectrum of the red supergiant star Antares in 1937.

== Career ==
After gaining her Ph.D. at age 24, Davis taught briefly at Smith College and at Vassar College. She did further work on stellar spectra at Mount Wilson Observatory on an AAUW Postdoctoral Fellowship. She worked as a researcher at Princeton University in 1940, assisting Henry Norris Russell to study ionized europium. In her last year at Princeton, 1942, Davis’s mother broke her ankle and Davis went home to St. Louis to help her. East St. Louis High School did not have anyone to teach physics because the former physics teacher had left to do work for the war, so she ended up teaching physics there for a period. Henry Russel visited Davis and her mother at her mother’s home in St. Louis to encourage Davis to come back to Princeton as soon as possible so she could continue her astronomy work there. She attended the International Astronomical Union meeting in Stockholm in 1938.

During World War II, she was involved in a rocket project at California Institute of Technology (Caltech), and at Ray Control Company in Pasadena. After the war, Davis worked at Beckman Laboratory in Pasadena, while her husband completed his education at Caltech. In 1950 she worked with astronomer Franklin E. Roach of the Naval Ordnance Test Station in Inyokern, California.

She returned to astronomy in 1962, working with Jesse L. Greenstein at Caltech on spectrometry projects until 1969. In 1972, she started working at the Jet Propulsion Laboratory. She was a life member of the Astronomical Society of the Pacific. She retired in 1985.

== Publications ==
- "The Spectral Sequence in Stars of Class S" Publications of the Astronomical Society of the Pacific 46(1934): 267–272.
- "A Photometric Study of H.D.C. 159176" Publications of the Astronomical Society of the Pacific 48(June 1936): 173-175.
- "Magnesium Hydride in Arcturus and Antares" Publications of the Astronomical Society of the Pacific 49(August 1937): 226.
- "The Line λ 5015 of He I in the Spectrum of Zeta Tauri" Publications of the Astronomical Society of the Pacific 52(April 1940): 147-148.
- "The ScO Band at λ 4858 in ο CETI" Publications of the Astronomical Society of the Pacific 52(June 1940): 207-208.
- "A Search for Thorium in Late-Type Stars" Publications of the Astronomical Society of the Pacific 55(February 1943): 41-43.

== Personal life ==
Davis married Bart N. Locanthi, an acoustical engineer, in 1943. They had their first daughter in 1948, followed by a second daughter in 1952 and a son in 1955. She was widowed in 1994, and died in 1999, aged 86 years, in Glendale, California. An oral history interview she gave to David DeVorkin in 1977 is included in the American Institute of Physics' International Catalog of Sources for History of Physics and Allied Sciences. The American Institute of Physics also holds a collection of photographs taken by Dorothy Davis Locanthi.
