= JBL Paragon =

One-piece stereo loudspeaker

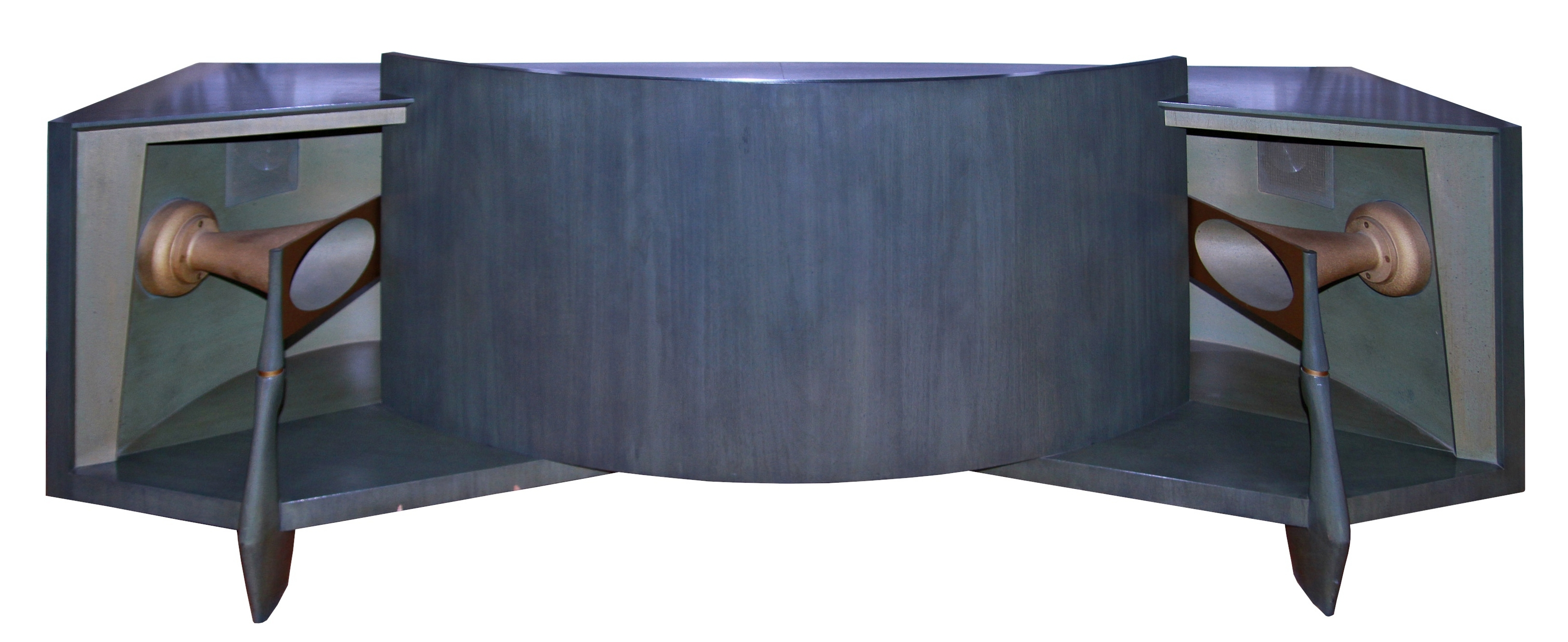
The JBL Paragon, measuring almost 9 feet (2.7 m) from left to right

The JBL D44000 Paragon is a one-piece stereo loudspeaker created by JBL that was introduced in 1957 and discontinued in 1983; its production run was the longest of any JBL speaker. At its launch, the Paragon was the most expensive domestic loudspeaker on the market.

Designed by Arnold Wolf from a concept elaborated by Richard Ranger, it is almost 9 feet (2.7 m) long and requires over a 100 hours of finishing by a team of craftsmen. Resembling a loudspeaker than a sideboard, it is a product for the company that was sought by after celebrities. With an estimated total production of about 1,000 units, it is sought after by collectors to this day.

== History ==
The Paragon is a horn-loaded, stereo speaker system within a single 9-foot-wide (2.7 m) housing. It is based on a diffusion principle developed by Richard Ranger as consultant to JBL. Launched in 1957, the Paragon is the world's earliest production stereo loudspeaker for home use, and also the most expensive speaker at the time. As the flagship JBL product, it cost $1,830 (£650) – equivalent to $21,000 in 2025. The "Paragon" is the product with the longest production run of all JBL loudspeakers. It was produced continually until it was discontinued in 1983, when it was replaced by a product line named "Everest".

=== Design ===
horizontal cross section of a Paragon unit, with labels showing the individual components

Since even the early days of stereophonic sound, designers were faced with the issue of directionality and the listener who was not located exactly in between the two speaker units. Col. Richard R. Ranger, a pioneer of stereophonic sound in the film industry, conceptualised the solution to the problem of reproducing stereo sound for all and not just the centrally-positioned listener. He devised a loudspeaker system where the sound from the speaker drive units would be reflected against curved surfaces (wood panels) within a cabinet to create a wide, uniform stereo image that would hold stable in any location within the listening room. Ranger elaborates on the JBL-Ranger Radial Refraction system of stereophonic reproduction thus:

... only along this axis of symmetry that the two speakers have consistently equal effect. As soon as the listener moves off axis, the speaker toward which he moves takes predominance. Sound intensity decreases rapidly with distance and the more distant speaker quickly loses out to the nearer.

This can be avoided by projecting the sound from each speaker against a curved surface which acts as a convex lens for the sound and directs it more strongly to the side opposite the speaker than it does to its own side. The convex refractor thus eliminates the sharp axis of symmetry where the slightest movement of the listener is so disturbing.

In the listening area in front of the integrated speaker system, the energy from the two stereo channels builds up a full front of sound which can readily be appreciated by more than one person. So the axis of symmetry no longer exerts its unstable equilibrium on the critical listener.

The term "unstable equilibrium" is not mere whimsy. In stereo reproduction, it is customary for the soloist to appear in the center. Then, certain sections of the accompanying music are positioned right or left; but it is most important that wherever they are, they STAY THERE. Uncertain movement of the apparent sound source gives a very queasy feeling.

Once it became possible to hold monaural sound to the center, it was found that with regular stereo everything fell into its proper place ... A whole curtain of sound was opened up.

Ranger's 9-foot prototype of the product, with plenty of right angles and shiny black Micarta skin, was bulky, imposing, and visually unattractive. Arnold Wolf was called in as the industrial design consultant to this project in early 1957. Wolf, who would later become president and chief executive of JBL, was initially asked to produce a shell version for dealers' shops. Due to transportation and installation constraints, it was decided that the speaker would be split into three components – the left and right channel enclosures, and the curved radiator panel – that could be easily re-assembled with a screwdriver. To support the weight and prevent deforming, the design called for six feet, of which four are height-adjustable. Instead of producing detailed drawings, Wolf worked with scale models. First, he created a 1:4 model in plastic, after which he made others. He ended with a 1:12 scale model that would show how it could be disassembled and reassembled. During the design phase, the relationship between Wolf and Ranger became very tense, and the project nearly collapsed. The parties came together over the month of June, and agreed on the definitive production specification for the Paragon. This would be a 2-way design.

=== Construction ===
Frontal aspects of a JBL Paragon

Sculpted leg

Horn (375 Compression driver)

As can be seen from the diagram, the unusual shape of the Paragon made it very complicated to build. Engineering and factory translated the design into one executable on the shop floor. After overcoming the manufacturing challenges posed by the curved refractor panels and the cabinet legs, the speaker entered production in late 1957.

Rear view of a JBL Paragon

075 Ring radiator, from rear

Connector terminals

The Paragon much resembles a sideboard, measures 106 × 33.75 × 24.5 inches (269 × 86 × 62 cm), and weighs 850 pounds (390 kg) according to the product brochure. Standard finishes include korina, birch, mahogany and ebony; premium wood finishes included light and dark walnut, oak, teak, rosewood; a piano lacquer finish would cost extra. A team of six worked on each unit, spending an estimated 112 to 125-man-hours to complete a single unit, most of it spent on finishing of the woodwork. After assembly, eight hours would be needed just for sanding down the entire enclosure. Then, several coats of varnish are applied by hand, allowed to dry, and then smoothed down by further rubbing.

=== Product revisions ===
Product brochure from JBL

The components used in the Paragon went through numerous changes over the years.

- 1957 – Paragon 44000 launched ("domestic" and "industrial" variants).
- Early 1960s – the 150-4C bass driver replaced by the LE15A.
- Early 1960s – SE408S power amplifier launched, and available for integration with Paragon as powered speakers (removed by the 1970s).
- 1979 – use the new drivers employing ferrite magnets instead of Alnico V – the LE15A bass driver replaced by the ferrite LE15H; the 375 midrange driver replaced with the Alnico 376.
- 1983 – Paragon discontinued.

=== Reception ===
Partick Vercher at L'Audiophile said that the ideal listening position is at least 3 metres away, and 40–50 cm lower than a normal seated position; alternatively the speaker needs to be hoisted up by that amount for a comfortable sound. The sound itself is described as possessing "unshakeable dynamics" when turned up loud, pacey without any sign of fatiguing distortion, and with an impressive separation of instruments. Sonic Flare describes the sound of the Paragon as possessing well-integrated "liquid highs, excellent midrange and bass", and proverbially worth dying for. There are rumours that Frank Sinatra and Dean Martin acquired three Paragons each – one for each of left, center and right channels – with which they used to monitor their recordings from master tapes.

Only about a thousand units were ever produced over its 25-year life. At the height of production, five units left the factory each week. In 2000, units in mint condition would fetch upwards of $20,000 on the second hand market. (Note: Info: December 2013 sale of JBL Paragon (C44) legendary speaker in very nice condition – Asking Price: USD $26250.00) It has featured in museum exhibitions, namely one held at Los Angeles County Museum of Art in 2011–12 entitled "California Design, 1930–1965: Living in a Modern Way."

=== Spin-offs and legacy ===
In 1960, JBL launched a smaller and less elaborate 3-way sideboard speaker, measuring 73.7 × 30 × 22.5 inches (187 × 76 × 57 cm), named the "C45 Metregon". Self powered Paragons and Metregons employing the JBL SE-408S stereo amplifier were optional. A miniature version, the C46 Minigon was also available in the early 1960s.
