= JBL =

American audio hardware manufacturer

- Formerly: Lansing Sound
- Type: Subsidiary
- Industry: Audio
- Founded: 1946; 80 years ago
- Founder: James Bullough Lansing
- Headquarters: Los Angeles, California, United States
- Products: Amplifiers, loudspeakers, headphones
- Owner: Samsung Electronics (2017–)
- Parent: Harman International Industries (1969–)
- Website: jbl.com

JBL is an American audio equipment manufacturer headquartered in Los Angeles, California. The company was founded in 1946 by James Bullough Lansing, an American audio engineer and loudspeaker designer. JBL currently serves the home and professional audio markets. Their home products include home audio speakers, waterproof Bluetooth speakers, and car audio. Their professional products include live PA systems, studio monitors, and loudspeakers for cinema. JBL is a subsidiary of Harman International, which is owned by Samsung Electronics.

== History ==
James Bullough Lansing and his business partner Ken Decker started a company in 1927 in Los Angeles, manufacturing six-and-eight-inch (150 and 200 mm) speaker drivers for radio consoles and radio sets. The firm was named Lansing Manufacturing Company, from March 1, 1927.

In 1933, head of the Metro-Goldwyn-Mayer (MGM) sound department, Douglas Shearer, dissatisfied with the loudspeakers of Western Electric and RCA, decided to develop his own. John Hilliard, Robert Stephens, and John F. Blackburn were part of the team that developed the Shearer Horn, with Lansing Manufacturing producing the 285 compression driver and the 15XS bass driver. The Shearer Horn gave the desired improvements, and Western Electric and RCA received the contracts to each build 75 units. Western Electric named them Diaphonics, and RCA used them in their RCA Photophones. Lansing Manufacturing was the only firm selling them as Shearer Horns. In 1936, the Shearer Horn received the Academy Scientific and Technical Award from the Academy of Motion Picture Arts and Sciences.

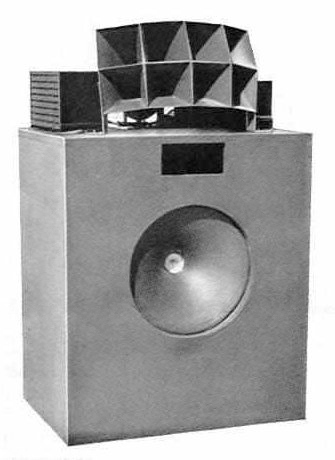
Lansing Iconic System loudspeaker for cinemas

Based on the experience developed with the Shearer Horn, Lansing produced the Iconic System loudspeaker for cinemas. The Iconic was a two-way speaker using a 15-inch (380 mm) woofer for low frequencies and a compression driver for high frequencies.

In 1939, Decker was killed in an airplane crash. The company soon began having financial troubles. In 1941, Lansing Manufacturing Company was bought by Altec Service Corporation, after which the name changed to "Altec Lansing." After Lansing's contract expired in 1946, he left Altec Lansing and founded Lansing Sound, which later changed to "James B. Lansing Sound" and was further shortened to "JBL Sound."

In 1946, JBL produced their first products, the model D101 15-inch loudspeaker and the model D175 high-frequency driver. The D175 remained in the JBL catalog through the 1970s. Both of these were near-copies of Altec Lansing products. The first original product was the D130, a 15-inch transducer for which a variant remained in production for the next 55 years. The D130 featured a 4-inch (100 mm) flat ribbon wire voice coil and Alnico V magnet. Two other products were the 12-inch (300 mm) D131 and the 8-inch (200 mm) D208 cone drivers.

The Marquardt Corporation gave the company early manufacturing space and a modest investment. William H. Thomas, the treasurer of Marquardt Corporation, represented Marquardt on Lansing's board of directors. In 1948, Marquardt took over the operation of JBL. In 1949, Marquardt was purchased by General Tire Company. The new company, not interested in the loudspeaker business, severed ties with Lansing. Lansing was reincorporated as James B. Lansing and moved the newly formed company to its first private location, on 2439 Fletcher Drive, Los Angeles.

A key to JBL's early development was Lansing's close business relationship with its primary supplier of Alnico V magnetic material, Robert Arnold of Arnold Engineering. Arnold saw JBL as an opportunity to sell Alnico V magnetic materials into a new market.

Lansing was noted as an innovative engineer but a poor businessman. Decker, his business partner, had died in 1939 in an airplane crash. In the late 1940s, Lansing struggled to pay invoices and ship products. Possibly as a result of deteriorating business conditions and personal issues, he committed suicide on September 4, 1949. The company then passed into the hands of Bill Thomas, JBL's vice president. Lansing had taken out a US$10,000 life insurance policy, naming the company as the beneficiary, a decision that allowed Thomas to continue the company after Lansing's death. Soon after, Thomas purchased Mrs. Lansing's one-third interest in the company and became the sole owner. Thomas is credited with revitalizing the company and spearheading a period of strong growth for the two decades following the founding of JBL.

Early products included the model 375 high-frequency driver and the 075 ultra-high frequency (UHF) ring-radiator driver. The ring-radiator drivers are also known as "JBL bullets" because of their distinctive shape. The 375 was a re-invention of the Western Electric 594 driver but with an Alnico V magnet and a four-inch voice coil. The 375 shared the same basic magnet structure as the D-130 woofer. JBL engineers Ed May and Bart N. Locanthi created these designs.

Two products from that era, the Hartsfield and the Paragon, continue to be highly desired on the collectors' market.

In 1955, the brand name JBL was introduced to resolve ongoing disputes with Altec Lansing Corporation. The company name, "James B. Lansing Sound, Incorporated," was retained, but the logo name was changed to JBL with its distinctive exclamation point.

The JBL 4320 series studio monitor was introduced through Capitol Records in Hollywood and became the standard monitor worldwide for its parent company, EMI. JBL's introduction to rock and roll music came via the adoption of the D130 loudspeaker by Leo Fender's Fender Guitar Company as the ideal driver for electric guitars.

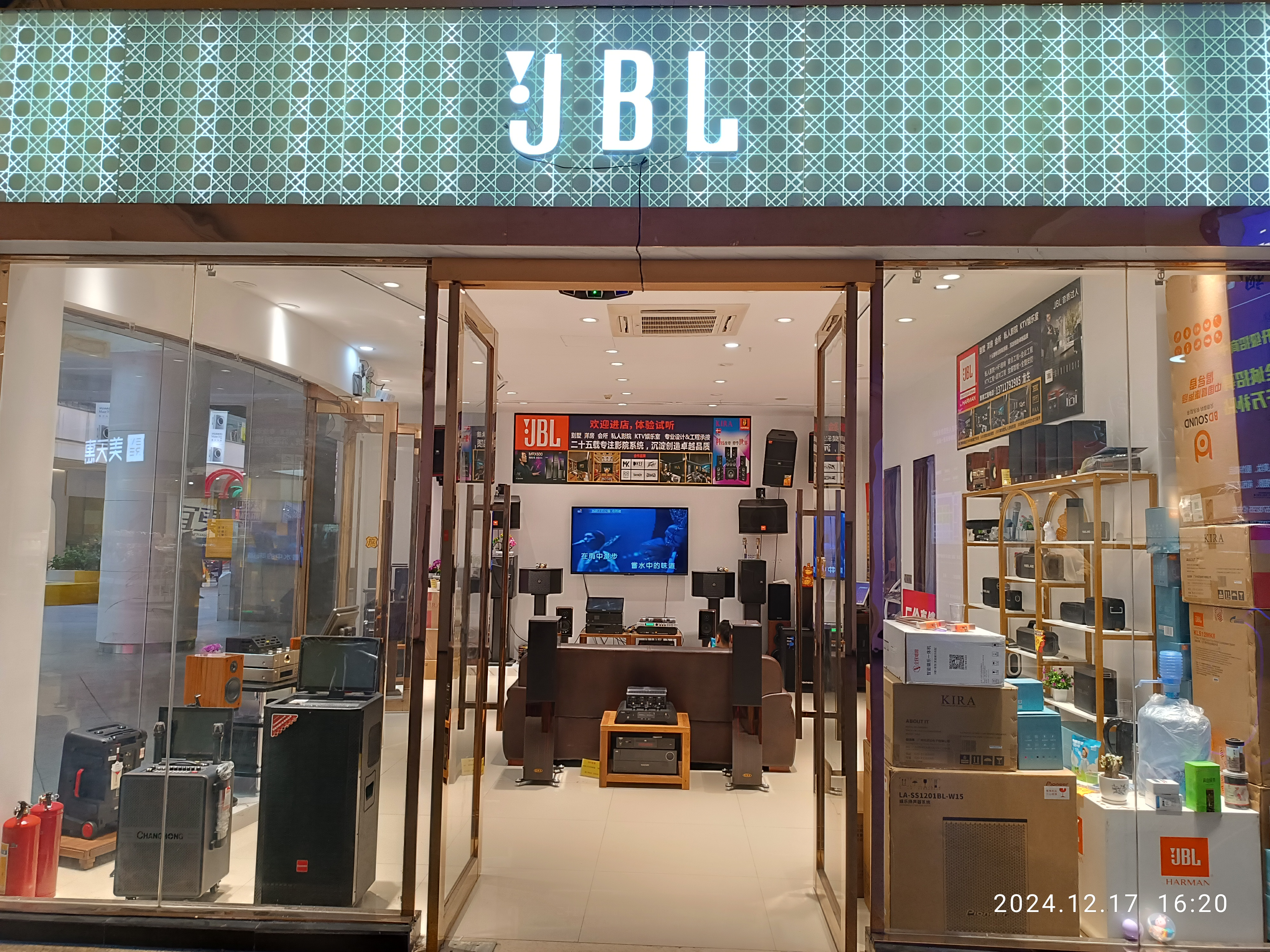
JBL store at South China Mall in Dongguan, China

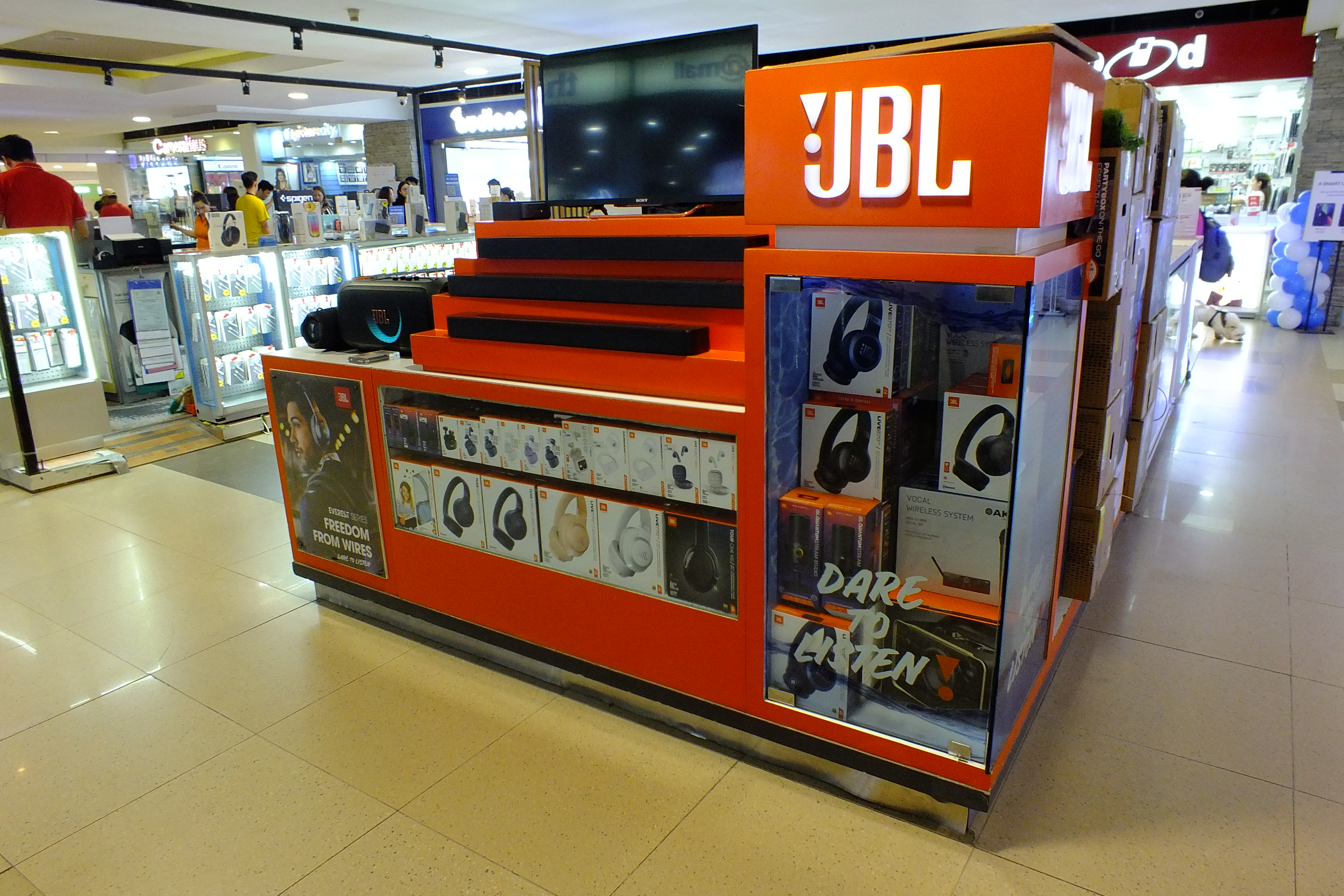
JBL flagship store at SM City Cebu in Cebu City, Philippines

In 1969, Thomas sold JBL to the Jervis Corporation (later renamed "Harman International"), headed by Sidney Harman. The 1970s saw JBL become a household brand, starting with the famous L-100, which was the bestselling loudspeaker model of any company at that time. The 1970s were also a time of major JBL expansion in the professional audio field from their studio monitors. By 1977, more recording studios were using JBL monitors than all other brands combined, according to a Billboard survey. The JBL L-100 and 4310 control monitors were popular home speakers. In the late 1970s, the new L-series designs L15, L26, L46, L56, L86, L96, L112, L150, and later the L150A and flagship L250 were introduced with improved crossovers, ceramic magnet woofers, updated midrange drivers, and aluminum-deposition phenolic resin tweeters. In the mid-1980s, the designs were again updated and redesigned with a new titanium-deposition tweeter diaphragm. The new L-series designations being the L20T, L40T, L60T, L80T, L100T, the Ti-series 18Ti, 120Ti, 240Ti, and the flagship 250Ti. To test speaker drivers, JBL in Glendale and Northridge used the roof as an outdoor equivalent to an anechoic chamber.

Over the next two decades, JBL went more mass-market with their consumer (Northridge) line of loudspeakers. At the same time, they made an entry into the high-end market with their project speakers, consisting of the Everest and K2 lines. JBL became a prominent supplier to the tour sound industry, their loudspeakers being employed by touring rock acts and music festivals. JBL products were the basis for the development of THX loudspeaker standard, which resulted in JBL becoming a popular cinema loudspeaker manufacturer.

== Automotive use ==
JBL are currently fitted to vehicle manufacturers such as Fiat, Kia and Toyota.

== Timeline ==
- 1927 – Founding of Lansing Manufacturing Company in Los Angeles
- 1934 – Douglas Shearer from MGM designs the first speaker for the cinema. Lansing builds system components.
- 1941 – Altec Service Company acquires Lansing Manufacturing Company
- 1944 – Lansing and Hilliard redefine the reference theater speaker with model A-4, renamed Voice of the Theatre
- 1946 – JBL creates the original 'JBL signature' logo with an exclamation (!) in black and white. Designed by Jerome Gould
- 1946 – Lansing leaves Altec and founded a new company, James B. Lansing Sound Inc.
- 1947 – JBL has a 15" speaker (38 cm), model D-130, using for the first time a 4 in (100 mm) voice coil in a speaker cone
- 1949 – James. B. Lansing dies of suicide; William Thomas became president of the company
- 1954 – The 375 compression engine is the first 4-inch engine sold; its response extends to 9 kHz
- 1954 – Presentation of acoustic lenses developed by Bart N. Locanthi
- 1955 – Leo Fender integrates the D-130 model in their amplifiers, thus starting the entry of JBL into professional music
- 1958 – Introduction of the one-piece JBL Paragon stereo speaker system
- 1962 – JBL creates the first 2-way studio monitor, using a high-frequency motor lens
- 1967 - JBL creates the iconic red box logo with the exclamation (!) and white lettering. Designed by Arnold Wolf, the president of JBL
- 1968 – JBL launches the 3-way speaker 4310
- 1969 – Sidney Harman acquires JBL
- 1969 – L-100, a consumer version of the 4310 is launched; it would sell over 125,000 pairs in the 70s
- 1969 – JBL components used in Bill Hanley's Woodstock sound system and many other rock festivals
- 1973 – 4300 Series launched, including the first 4-way speaker
- 1975 – 4682 Model Line Array Strongbox
- 1979 – Technology diamond surround for control of high frequency resonances in
- 1979 – Development of Symmetrical Field Geometry (SFG)
- 1980 – Pavilion Bi-Radial Constant dispersion technology
- 1981 – The first Bi-Radial monitor, 4400, for the recording studio
- 1982 – Titanium is used as a material for compression engines
- 1984 – JBL acquires UREI
- 1986 – The first models of the Control series introduced
- 1990 – Vented Gap Cooling technology (reduces low frequencies transducer temperature)
- 1991 – The first pro-audio speaker based on neodymium with Array Series
- 1995 – Birth of the EON system
- 1995 – First Neodymium Differential Drive speaker
- 1996 – Creation of the HLA standard with Line Array Space Frame design
- 1999 – JBL used at Woodstock 1999
- 2000 – Creation of VerTec Line Array system
- 2000 – Launch of EVO, a DSP-controlled loudspeaker
- 2002 – VerTec is used for the Super Bowl, the Grammy Awards and the ceremony of the 2002 FIFA World Cup (Seoul, Korea)

== Examples of applications ==
- Academy of Motion Picture Arts and Sciences - AMPAS (Samuel Goldwyn Theater, Hollywood, United States).
- Institut de Recherche et de Coordination Acoustique/Musique - IRCAM (Pierre Boulez, Paris, France, 1974–1991).
- Digital Cinema Project - GAUMONT (Philippe Binant, Paris, France, 2000–2008).

== JBL Bluetooth speaker models ==
JBL produces a variety of Bluetooth speaker model families, each tailored to different needs:

- JBL Go – Ultra‑compact and affordable, designed for everyday portability.
- JBL Clip – Small speakers with an integrated carabiner clip, ideal for travel and outdoor use.
- JBL Wind – Compact speaker with an LCD screen (except S model) and a dedicated handlebar mount that can be attached to a bicycle.
- JBL Tuner – Small speaker with Bluetooth connectivity, FM/DAB radio, an LCD screen and a retractable antenna.
- JBL Horizon – Small Bluetooth speaker with FM radio, adjustable ambient light, LCD screen, and alarm feature. Advertised as a fixed bedside speaker, given it has no battery and only works on AC.
- JBL Grip - Cylindrical, mid-sized speakers 30% smaller than the Flip series, with customizable lighting effects.
- JBL Flip – Cylindrical, mid-sized speakers offering waterproofing and strong audio for their size, as well as lossless playback over USB-C (Flip 7 and later).
- JBL Charge – Larger than the Flip, featuring long battery life and the ability to charge other devices via USB (power bank feature), as well as lossless playback over USB-C on newer models.
- JBL Xtreme – Rugged speaker with a shoulder strap included in the box, power bank feature, removable battery (Xtreme 4 and later), wired lossless playback over USB-C (Xtreme 5 or newer), as well as customizable lighting effects starting from the Xtreme 5. Has a powerful sound designed for outdoor use, while still being relatively portable.
- JBL Boombox – Large, heavy-duty speakers with extended battery life, deep bass, and two newer bass boost modes with the Boombox 4: "deep bass" for lower frequencies while listening indoors, and "punchy bass" for tighter and more impactful bass when using outdoors.
- JBL Pulse – Cylindrical speakers with integrated LED light shows that sync to music.
- JBL PartyBox – High-output party speakers with lighting effects, mic/guitar inputs, and event-ready features.
- JBL Authentics – Line-up of mid-sized speakers inspired on designs from the 70s, with vastly different connectivity, driver setup, and battery specs between models.

== See also ==
- List of studio monitor manufacturers
