= Eldorado Electrodata =

Defunct electronics and computing company

Eldorado Electrodata Corporation
- Formerly: Sargent-Rayment Company (1927–1929, 1947–1956); EM Sargent Company (1929–1947); Eldorado Electronics (1956 – c. 1967)
- Type: Public
- Industry: Electronics
- Founded: 1927; 99 years ago
- Founder: Ed Sargent; Lyndon C. Rayment
- Defunct: 1976; 50 years ago
- Headquarters: Concord, California
- Key people: Will Rayment (president, 1947–1956); Leigh A. Brite (president, 1969–1976)

Eldorado Electrodata Corporation (formerly Eldorado Electronics and originally the Sargent-Rayment Company) was an American electronics company based in Concord, California. The company was founded in 1927 and initially sold radio equipment before moving into digital measuring instruments following a rename in 1956. It later developed computer terminals and minicomputers.

== History ==
=== Sargent-Rayment Company (1927–1956) ===
Eldorado Electrodata was founded in Oakland, California, as the Sargent-Rayment Company in 1927 by Ed Sargent and Lyndon C. Rayment. Among the company's first offerings was a TRF receiver called the Sargent-Rayment 7, which gained national renown after being advertised in Radio World. Following the Wall Street crash of 1929, Lyndon Rayment sold all his interest into the company to Sargent, who renamed the company to the EM Sargent Company and started manufacturing superheterodyne receivers. During World War II the EM Sargent Company produced a long list of radio equipment, including marine radios and direction finders. After the war, Sargent found himself in dire financial straits and sold the company back to Rayment before committing suicide in 1948.

After assuming control of the company again, Lyndon Rayment hired his 21-year-old son Will to be president of the company. Lyndon died of a heart attack in 1951, leaving Will Rayment as the owner of the company. Will, who had experience as a teenage Navy Radioman from 1943 to 1945, managed the company while also developing its products. In 1953, Will contracted aseptic meningitis. His recovery took long, during which the company stagnated. He sold the company to Donner Scientific, owned by W. K. Rosenberry, while still retaining his role as president until 1955, when he quit after Donner cut his yearly bonus. Will bought the Sargent-Rayment name from Donner for his own radio equipment business, which he managed until 1960. Donner renamed the original Sargent-Rayment company as Eldorado Electronics in 1956.

=== Eldorado (1956–1973) ===
Eldorado primarily marketed radiation detectors and electronic devices for industrial and military use around the turn of the 1960s. In 1957, Rosenberry moved Eldorado's headquarters from Oakland to Berkeley, California, and again to Concord, California, in 1963. By this point the company's most renowned products were its digital measuring instruments, the most profitable of which were voltmeters, but also frequency counters and timekeeping devices such as stopwatches and clocks.

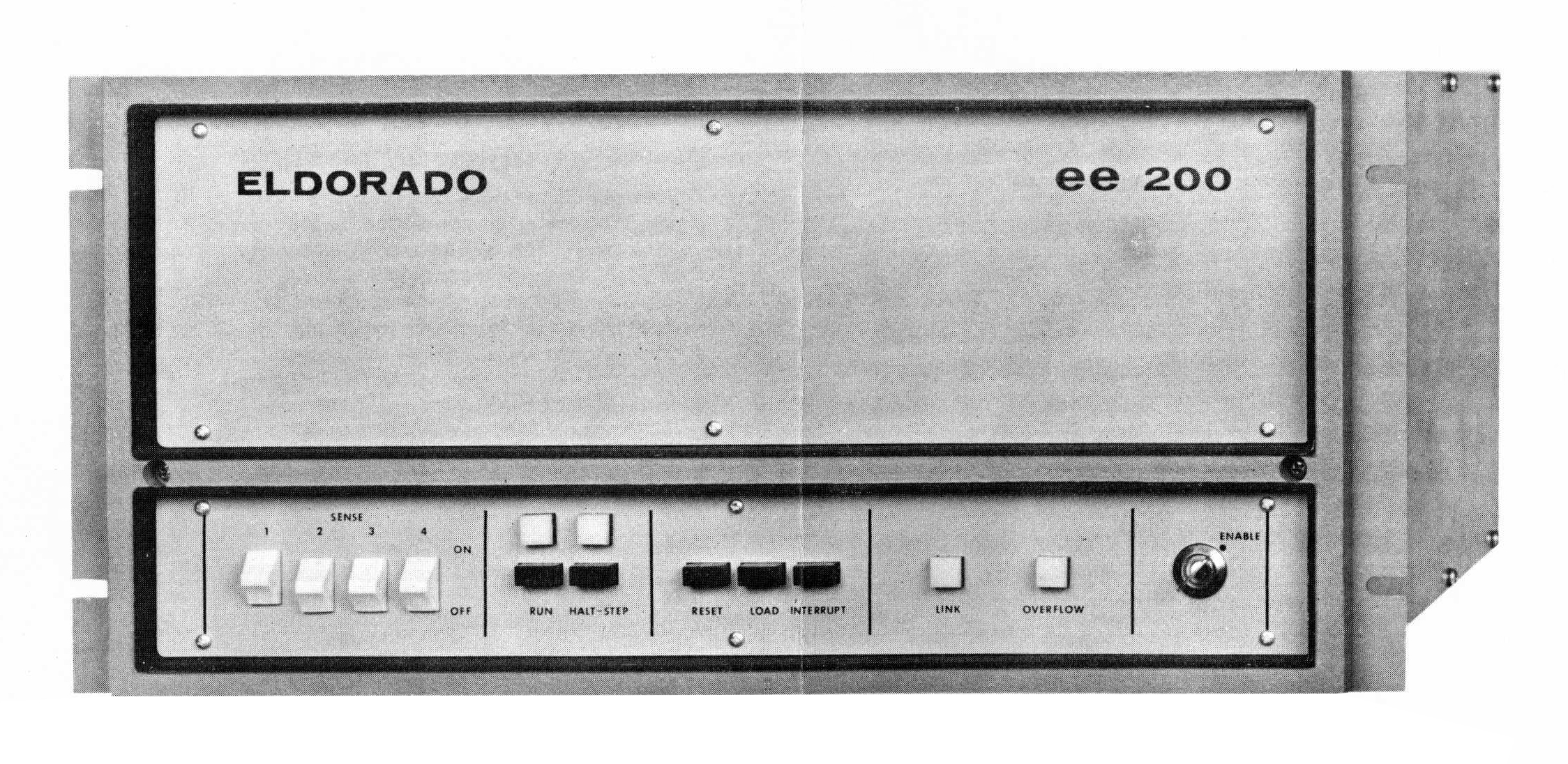
Front view of the ee 200

Leigh A. Brite, formerly of Packard Bell Electronics, joined the company in 1967 as director of engineering; by this point the company was renamed Eldorado Electrodata. In 1968, Eldorado released the ee 200, a 16-bit minicomputer which Brite helped engineer. In his free time during the first couple years of his tenure at Eldorado, Brite developed a prototype for a smart video computer terminal. He turned to his friend Wally Wrathall to market it, who encouraged Brite to buy Eldorado along with Wrathall.

The buyout was completed in 1969; as a result of this venture, Brite was promoted to president while Wrathall redirected all manufacturing toward the production of terminals. Wrathall had no interest in the company's measuring instruments but was encouraged to buy Eldorado because of its steady business and high cash flow. In addition the company provided a large supply of electronics manufacturing equipment and an educated employee base at the ready. Wrathall previously worked at Del Monteas an accounting manager but quit after nearly a decade in 1968 after he made the front cover of Del Monte's internal magazine, highlighting him as the youngest accounting manager in the company's history. He felt that the undue emphasis on his youth indicated that Del Monte "were old line, stodgy, and progressiveness was not to be expected". Eldorado filed to go public in the beginning of 1970. It held its initial public offering in August that year.

The first terminals marketed by Eldorado were not based on Brite's video terminal prototypes but were rather conventional teletype terminals. Introduced in 1969, the Models 123, 124, and 125 used the ee 200 as a central processing unit and sold for $30,000 each (equivalent to $263,385 in 2025). Within a year, the company was able to move 250 units. In July 1970 Eldorado introduced the Model 133, a desk-mounted smart teletype terminal that could also operate as a standalone computer. It used a IBM 2741 as the teletype of choice, while the bespoke minicomputer that served as its CPU had a cycle time of 1.1 μsec and came equipped with between 4 and 32 KB of core memory. The Model 133 contained a three-deck Compact Cassette recorder that allowed 180 thousand characters to be recorded to one 60-minute cassette, at a read–write speed of 400 cps. Eldorado offered the Model 133 in three variants: an offline variant (Model 101) that comprised the teletype, minicomputer and cassette decks; an online variant (Model 102) which comprised the aforementioned along with a modem for transmission of data to a remote mainframe; (Note: Modem transmission on the Model 102 could be initiated locally by the operator or remotely by the mainframe via the telephone line (Staff writer 1970b, p. 13).) and the "data converter" (Model 109), which was a Model 101 with a half-inch deck for IBM 9-track tapes and the processing necessary to convert the Compact Cassette signal to IBM's format. The teletype could optionally be replaced with a plotter for an additional $18,750. Eldorado followed this up with the Model 140, a back-to-basics desk-mounted terminal using the ee 200 as its CPU.

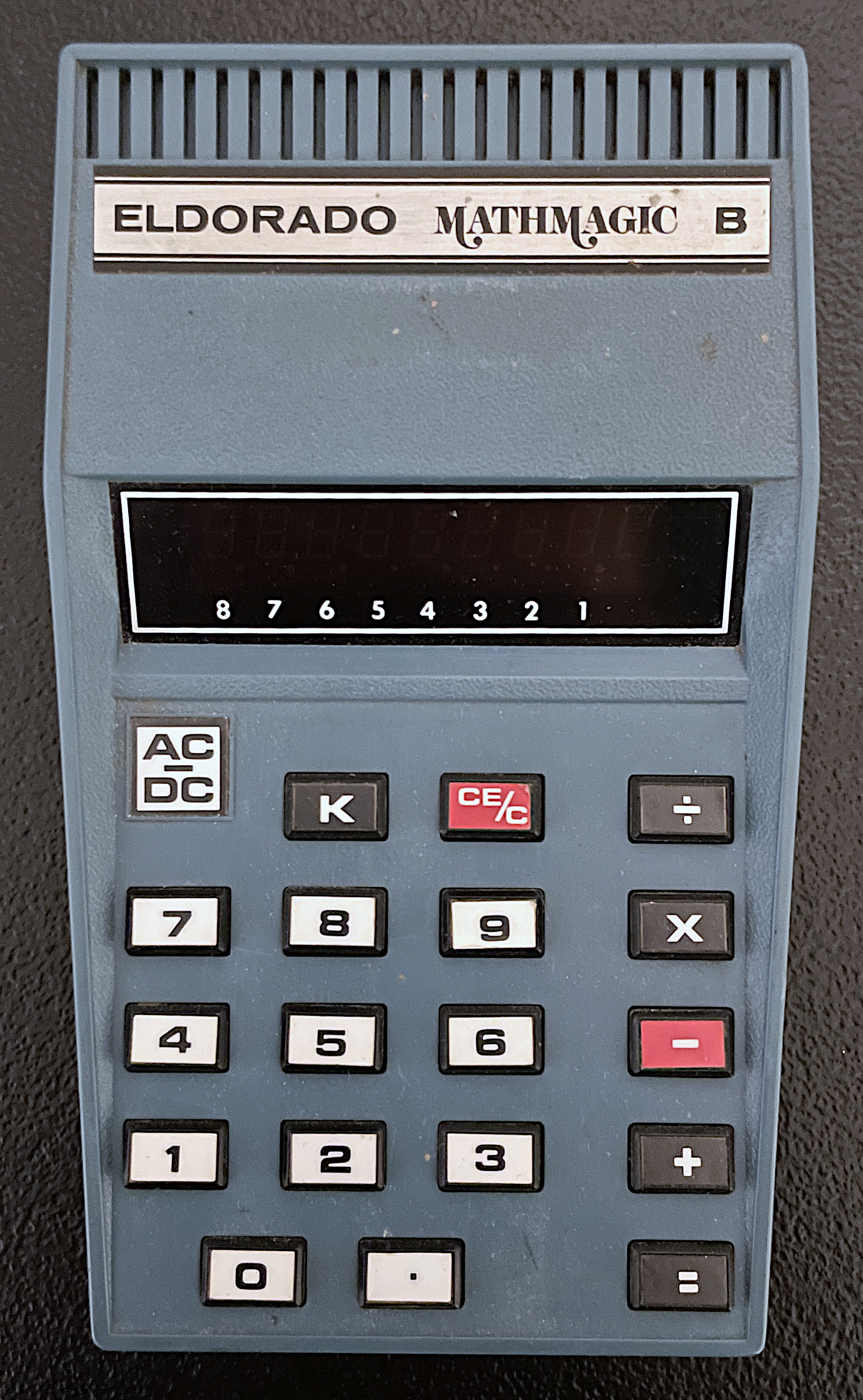
Mathmagic B pocket calculator, circa 1972

In 1970 the company had plans to release a pocket calculator with help from Texas Instruments. Earlier in the year Brite had contracted a semiconductor foundry to produce a microprocessor based on his circuit design that allowed him to build a prototype for a pocket calculator. Eldorado hired Texas Instruments to finalize the design and mass manufacture Brite's chip, delivering the parts to Eldorado for final manufacturing. However, the calculator project was plagued with delays, TI routinely reporting problems with production. It was six months past the final deadline when the company discovered the existence of the Pocketronic, a calculator smaller than Eldorado's design which was introduced by Canon in collaboration with TI, using TI's own calculator microprocessor. Wrathall marked the discovery as "the end of [his and Brite's] dreams". The company planned to sue TI but were deterred from the high cost of an attorney willing to battle such a large corporation. Meanwhile, the strong focus on the calculator project led Eldorado's computer systems development to falter, leading to a lack of cash flow amid that year's recession.

Brite's prototype eventually came to fruition as the Models 8K and 8M, introduced in March 1972 and priced under $180 each. Brite and Wrathall had by this point sold the company back to its original owners, breaking even with their combined cost of buying the company. Eldorado announced three more calculators by the middle of 1972, including the Touch Magic, "no bigger than a pack of cigarettes" according to Administrative Management.

Eldorado stopped manufacturing small business systems in late 1972 and began selling the ee 200 on an OEM basis to computer systems integrators. This was a move described by Computerworld as a reversal of contemporary industry trends. Despite expanding its sales force for calculators and digital clocks around the same time, the company went bankrupt and was forced to liquidate its assets in 1973. The company was still extant in 1976, with 200 employees and Brite still president as listed in that year's Bay Area Employer Directory. However the Franchise Tax Board of California suspended the company in June 1976.

== Notes ==
The Eldorado computer models of 1970-1973 were first based on the MicroData computer. That computer was replaced by one developed by Dick Pasternak. Pasternak became the Engineering Manager.

The Eldorado had an architecture somewhat similar to a DEC PDP-11, but it was an 8-bit design. A big plus was that it was much more compact than the MicroData unit.

A major use of Model 102 was remote data communications. Fedder Data System of Baltimore, MD had a business providing back-office computation for small, independent accounting firms. The business model was that the customer accountant would enter data during working hours, capturing it on a cassette. At closing time, the computer placed the 1200 baud modem into auto-answer mode and waited for a poll from the Fedder mainframe in Baltimore. Actually, the computer doing the calling was another Eldorado computer, equipped with a 1/2" magnetic tape drive, compatible with the Fedder mainframe. This polling would proceed in rotation over the evening hours, calling each customer system in turn. The software had multiple checksums and re-transmit record ability to account for the noise that was prevalent on 1972 1200 baud dial-up phone lines.

This project was developed by 3 software engineers over a period of about 6 months in 1970–71.
