= James Bullough Lansing =

Loudspeaker designer, audio company founder

- Born: James Martini; January 2, 1902; Greenridge, Nilwood Township, Macoupin County, Illinois, U.S.
- Died: September 29, 1949 (aged 47); San Marcos, California, U.S.
- Occupations: Engineer, inventor, designer
- Employer(s): Lansing Manufacturing Company, Altec Lansing, JBL

James Bullough Lansing (born James Martini, January 2, 1902 – September 29, 1949) was a pioneering American audio engineer and loudspeaker designer who was most notable for establishing two audio companies that bear his name, Altec Lansing and JBL (the latter taken from his initials).

== Early life ==
James Martini was born on January 2, 1902, in Greenridge, a coal mining town in Nilwood Township, Illinois, to parents Henry Martini of St. Louis, Missouri, and Grace Erbs Martini of Central City, Illinois. His father was a coal mining engineer which meant the family moved around considerably in James' early years. He was the ninth of fourteen children. He lived for a short time with the Bullough family in Litchfield, Illinois, and later took their name.

Lansing graduated eighth grade at Lawrence Middle School in Springfield, Illinois, attended Springfield High School and also took courses at a small business college in Springfield.

At a young age he built a Leyden jar to play pranks on his friends. He also built crystal sets and a radio transmitter which was apparently powerful enough for the signal to reach Great Lakes Naval Station in Illinois. Lansing's transmitter was then dismantled when the Navy tracked down the source.

Lansing had worked as an automotive mechanic and attended an automotive school in Detroit courtesy of the dealer he worked for.

His mother died on November 1, 1924, when he was 22. He then left home and moved to Salt Lake City. In 1925 while he was working as an engineer for a local radio station, he met his future wife, Glenna Peterson. He also worked for the Baldwin Radio Company and met his future business partner, Ken Decker in the city.

== Career ==
Lansing and Decker moved to Los Angeles where they set up a business manufacturing loudspeakers. It was called the Lansing Manufacturing Company. Just before the company was registered on March 9, 1927, Lansing changed his name from James Martini to James Bullough Lansing at the suggestion of his future wife, Glenna. Most of his brothers had adopted the surname Martin, two of which (Bill and George) came to LA to work with him.

Decker was killed in an airplane crash in 1939 and Lansing Manufacturing Company began to suffer financial difficulties without his business guidance. Altec Service Corporation bought Lansing Manufacturing Company in 1941, seeing the company as a valuable source for loudspeaker components. The combined company was named Altec Lansing. James B. Lansing was made VP of Engineering with a five-year contract.

In 1946, Lansing left the company on the day his contract expired and started a new company called "Lansing Sound, Incorporated". Altec Lansing had a problem with that name's similarity to trademarked brands they had developed, so James Bullough Lansing renamed his new company "James B. Lansing Sound, Incorporated". Eventually, this became shortened to JBL on product branding and then officially as the company name.

James Lansing was noted as an innovative engineer, but a poor businessman. At the end of 1948, only their second year, JBL had an operating loss of $2500. By the beginning of 1949, the company had moved headquarters four times in three years, causing disruption in production, and JBL was struggling to pay its suppliers. In late 1949, the company's debts had reached $20,000.

== Death ==
Lansing committed suicide, hanging himself from an avocado tree outside his San Marcos ranch home on September 29, 1949, aged 47. He is buried at Inglewood Park Cemetery in Los Angeles. At the Audio Engineering Society's 1958 convention, Lansing was posthumously awarded a Citation "for contributions to loudspeaker design."
