= Audio signal =

Representation of sound, typically as an electrical voltage

An audio signal is a representation of sound, typically using either a changing level of electrical voltage for analog signals or a series of binary numbers for digital signals. Audio signals have frequencies in the audio frequency range of roughly 20 to 20,000 Hz, which corresponds to the lower and upper limits of human hearing. Audio signals may be synthesized directly, or may originate at a transducer such as a microphone, musical instrument pickup, phonograph cartridge, or tape head. Loudspeakers or headphones convert an electrical audio signal back into sound.

Digital audio systems represent audio signals in a variety of digital formats.

An audio channel or audio track is an audio signal communications channel in a storage device or mixing console. It is used in operations such as multi-track recording and sound reinforcement.

== Signal flow ==
Signal flow is the path an audio signal will take from source to the speaker or recording device. Signal flow may be short and simple, as in a home audio system, or long and convoluted in a recording studio and larger sound reinforcement system, as the signal may pass through many sections of a large mixing console, external audio equipment, and even different rooms.

== Parameters ==
Audio signals may be characterized by parameters such as their bandwidth, nominal level, power level in decibels (dB), and voltage level. The relationship between power and voltage is determined by the impedance of the signal path. Signal paths may be single-ended or balanced.

Audio signals have somewhat standardized levels depending on the application. Outputs of professional mixing consoles are most commonly at line level. Consumer audio equipment will also output at a lower line level. Microphones generally output at an even lower level, known as mic level.

== Digital equivalent ==
The digital form of an audio signal is used in audio plug-ins and digital audio workstation (DAW) software. The digital information passing through the DAW (i.e., from an audio track through a plug-in and out a hardware output) is an audio signal.

A digital audio signal can be sent over optical fiber, coaxial and twisted pair cable. A line code and potentially a communication protocol are applied to render a digital signal for a transmission medium. Digital audio transports include ADAT, TDIF, TOSLINK, S/PDIF, AES3, MADI, audio over Ethernet and audio over IP.

== See also ==
- Analog recording
- Audio editing software
- Audio engineer
- Audio signal processing
- Digital recording
- Equalization (audio)
- Professional audio
- Psychoacoustics
- Sound intensity
- Sound recording and reproduction
- Stereophonic sound
- Surround sound
