= Audio interface =

Device used to interface audio signals with a computer

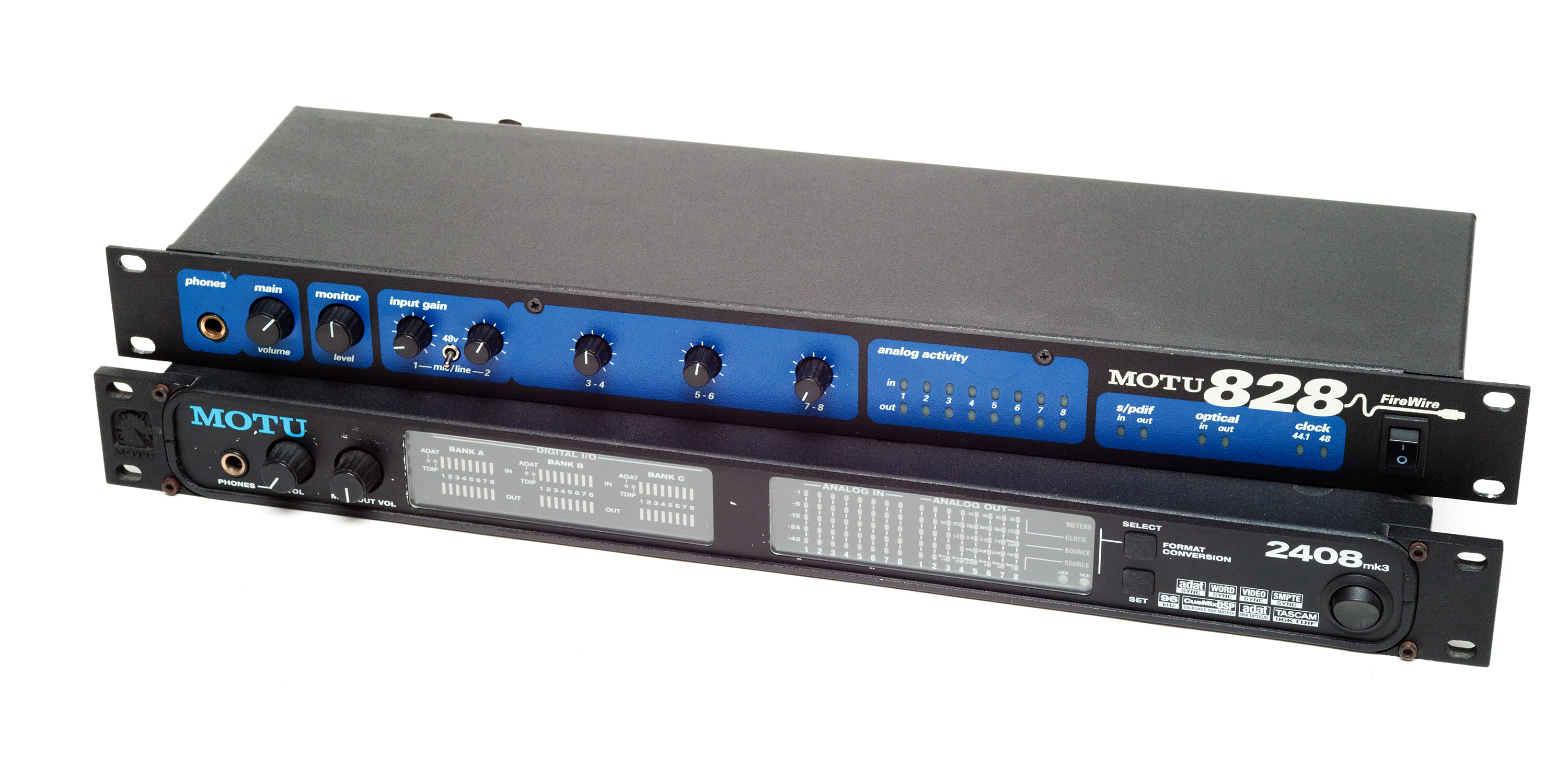
Two early rackmount audio interfaces

An audio interface is a piece of computer hardware that allows the input and output of audio signals to and from a host computer or recording device.

Audio interfaces are closely related to computer sound cards, but whereas sound cards are optimized for audio playback an audio interface is primarily intended to provide low-latency analog-to-digital and digital format conversion for professional audio applications.

Audio interfaces may include microphone preamps, as well as analog line inputs, DI inputs, and ADAT or S/PDIF digital inputs. Outputs are analog line, headphones and digital. They're typically available as external units, either as desktop devices or in a 19-inch rackmount format. Audio interfaces range from two channels in and out, to over 30.

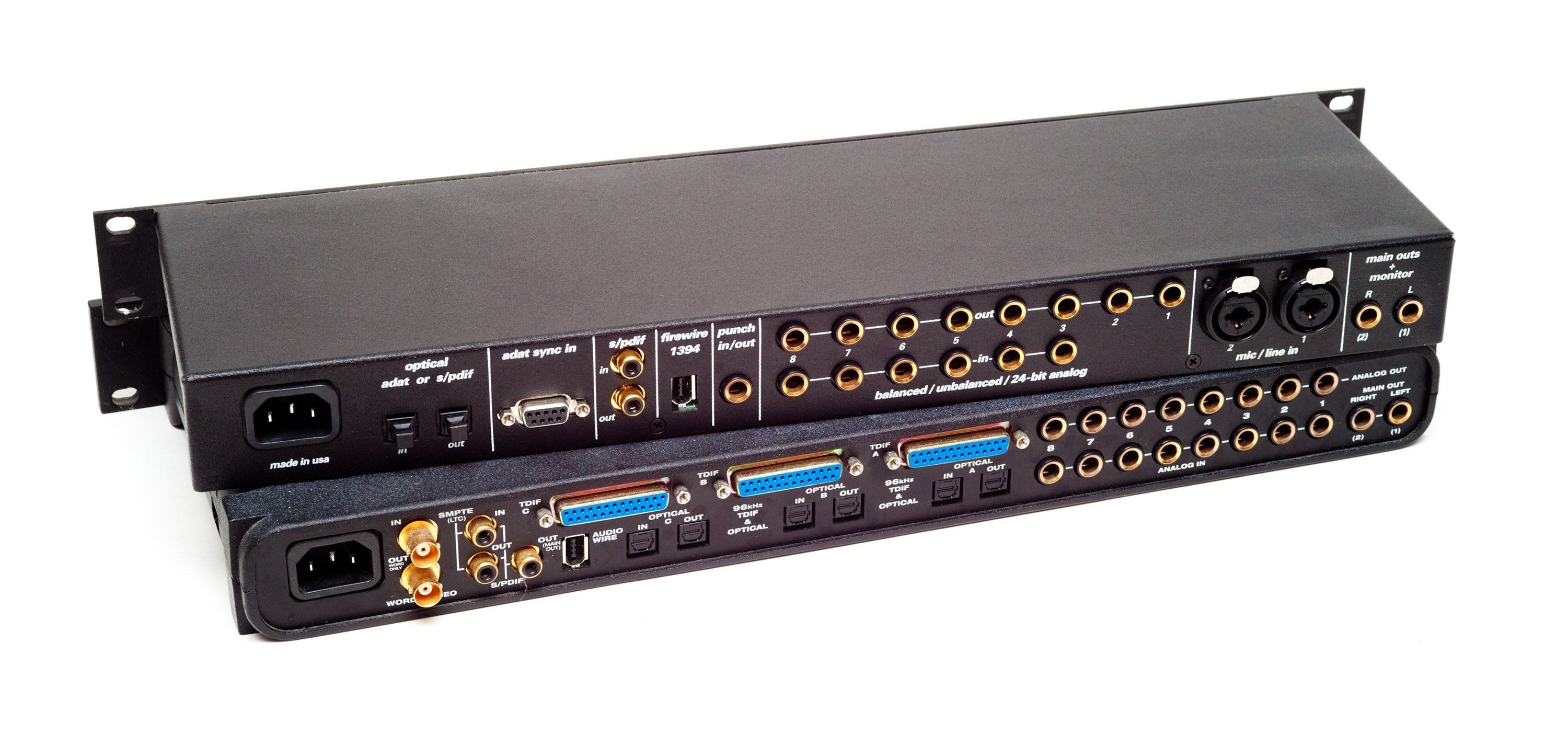
Professional audio interfaces often have industry-standard inputs, such as XLR and 1/4" audio jacks, in this case ADAT, TDIF, and S/PDIF

== History ==
Standalone audio interfaces grew from the proprietary hard disk recording market of the 1980s and 1990s, but advances in processor power and hard drive speed meant that, by the mid-1990s, standard home computers were capable of recording multi-channel audio at 16-bit, 44khz compact disc standard.

Early systems such as Digidesign's Sound Tools (1989) and Session 8 (1993) and the Ensoniq PARIS (1998) consisted of an external unit that connected to the host computer with a ISA or SCSI card, but from the late 1990s onwards it became practical to use standard computer interfaces such as FireWire, USB, and eventually Thunderbolt instead.

== Versus mixers ==
Although there is a degree of functional overlap, audio interfaces are differentiated from audio mixers in that they are intended to pass multi-channel audio directly to a host digital audio workstation, whereas mixers generally sum their inputs into a simple two-channel stereo pair. Audio interfaces are therefore often simple rackmount boxes, without faders, although as of 2020 some digital mixers provide multi-channel audio passthrough.

== Notable manufacturers ==
- Apogee Electronics
- Arturia
- Audient
- Avid, optimised for Pro Tools
- Behringer
- Creative
- Focusrite
- M-Audio
- MOTU
- Native Instruments
- PreSonus
- Roland
- Solid State Logic
- Steinberg
- TASCAM
- Universal Audio
