= VoATM =

Data protocol

Voice over Asynchronous Transfer Mode (VoATM) is a data protocol used to transport packetized voice signals over an Asynchronous Transfer Mode (ATM) network. In ATM, the voice traffic is encapsulated using AAL1/AAL2 ATM packets. VoATM over DSL is a similar service, which is used to carry packetized voice signals over a DSL connection.

== Protocols ==
- ATM Adaptation Layer 1 (AAL1)
- ATM Adaptation Layer 2 (AAL2)

== Deployment ==
VoATM is a multi-service, high speed, scalable technology but rarely found because of its expensive services.

== Prioritization ==
Prioritization is implemented through QoS parameters.

== Fragmentation ==
Fragmentation is built into ATM with its small, fixed-sized, 53-byte cells.

== Variable delay ==
Dynamic Bandwidth Circuit Emulation Service (DBCES) does not send a constant bit stream of cells but transmit only at an active voice call, reducing delays and variations.

== Echo cancellation ==
VoATM transports data, voice, and video at very high speed. The same method for echo cancellation is employed.

== See also ==
Professional wide band audio over ATM as standardized by Audio Engineering Society in AES47.
