= Word clock =

Clock signal used to synchronise digital audio devices

In digital audio electronics, a word clock or wordclock (sometimes sample clock, which can have a broader meaning) is a clock signal used to synchronise other devices, such as digital audio tape machines and compact disc players, which interconnect via digital audio signals. Word clock is so named because it clocks each audio sample. Samples are represented in data words.

S/PDIF, AES/EBU, MADI, ADAT, and TDIF are some of the formats that use a word clock. Various audio over Ethernet systems use communication protocols to distribute word clock. The device that generates the word clock is the clock source for all the other audio devices.

The signal is used for synchronizing digital audio signals between devices, such as CD players, audio I/O cards, etc. It allows all the components in the signal path to process the data and remain synchronized with each other.

== Comparison to timecode ==
Word clock should not be confused with timecode; word clock is used entirely to keep a perfectly timed and constant bitrate to avoid timing errors that can cause data transmission errors. Timecode is metadata about the media data being transmitted. Time code can be used as an initial phase reference for jam sync using the word clock as the frequency reference.

== Over coax cable ==
Professional digital audio equipment may have a word clock input or output to synchronize timing between multiple devices. Although the electrical characteristics of the word clock signal have not been completely standardized, some characteristics should always apply. Items that should remain consistent are TTL level, a 75ohm output impedance, 75-ohm cables and a 75-ohm terminating resistor at the end of a chain or cable.

Proper termination of the word clock signal with a 75ohm resistor is important. It prevents the clock signal from reflecting back into the cable and causing false detection of extra 1s and 0s. Some digital equipment includes a switchable terminator, some include a hardwired terminator and others have no terminator at all. An unfortunate aspect is that some equipment manuals do not indicate whether a hardwired terminator is included.

A chain connection from the source through the receivers may increase jitter. Using clock-distributing devices for parallel transmission is a better method. The length and quality of coaxial cables are important.

== Over AES3 ==
The AES11 standard defines a means for carrying a word clock over an AES3 connection. In this context, the word clock is known as a Digital Audio Reference Signal (DARS).

In Annex B, the AES11 standard also describes common practice in transmitting and receiving a plain word clock signal. This is not an attempt to standardize it; the annex is informative only.

== See also ==
- Phase-locked loop
