= Multichannel =

Multichannel or multi-channel may refer to:

- Multichannel audio, i.e.
  - Stereophonic sound, namely two channel audio
  - Surround sound, more than two channel audio
  - Ambisonics, a studio or live way of recording with many channels
- Offering multiple audio tracks on a broadcast channel: see Sound multiplex in broadcasting
  - Multichannel television sound, an American standard for analogue television
- Having or offering multiple television channels: see Multichannel television
  - Digital multicast television network
  - Multichannel Multipoint Distribution Service (MMDS), a standard for analogue television
  - Multichannel television in Canada
  - Multichannel television in the United States
- Multichannel marketing
- Multi-channel network, a YouTube classification of for-profit channels
- Multichannel News
- Multicanal (Argentina), a defunct Argentine subscription television and Internet provider company
- MPEG Multichannel
- MADI, Multichannel Audio Digital Interface
- McASP, Multichannel Audio Serial Port
- Scanning Multichannel Microwave Radiometer
- Joint multichannel trunking and switching system
- Multibus, Multichannel I/O Bus
- MVDDS, Multichannel Video and Data Distribution Service
- MMDF, Multichannel Memorandum Distribution Facility
- Multichannel recordings made with microelectrode arrays
