= AES52 =

Audio metadata standard

AES52 is a standard first published by the Audio Engineering Society in March 2006 that specifies the insertion of unique identifiers into the AES3 digital audio transport structure.

== Background ==
The AES3 transport stream continues to be used extensively in both discrete and network based audio systems alongside audio stored as files. Audio content is moving towards being handled by asset management systems and descriptive metadata is associated with that content is also being stored within systems. In order to provide a mechanism for AES3 transport streams to have similar abilities to work with content management systems, some form of unique label is required which can provide the link with these systems. One of the unique labels currently standardised in the media industry is the SMPTE UMID (SMPTE 330M-2004) while another commonly used in the Information Technology area is the International Electrotechnical Commission (IEC) UUID.

== Operation ==
The standard specifies the method for inserting unique identifiers into the user data area of an AES3 stream. This specifically covers the use of UUID as well as a basic or extended SMPTE UMID but can be extended to embed other data types into the AES3 stream by registering these with the AES so the standard can be updated to include these by following AES due process.
