= AES51 =

Method of carrying ATM cells over Ethernet for use by AES47

AES51 is a standard first published by the Audio Engineering Society in June 2006 that specifies a method of carrying Asynchronous Transfer Mode (ATM) cells over Ethernet physical structure intended in particular for use with AES47 to carry AES3 digital audio transport structure. The purpose of this is to provide an open standard, Ethernet based approach to the networking of linear (uncompressed) digital audio with extremely high quality-of-service alongside standard Internet Protocol connections.

This standard specifies a method, also known as "ATM-E", of carrying ATM cells over hardware specified for IEEE 802.3 (Ethernet). It is intended as a companion standard to AES47 (Transmission of digital audio over ATM networks), to provide a standard method of carrying ATM cells and real-time clock over hardware specified for Ethernet.
