= UUI =

UUI may refer to:

- Universal USB Installer, an open-source live Linux USB flash drive creation software
- Urge urinary incontinence, urinary incontinence due to an overactive bladder
- User to User Indication, a field of the 3-byte CPS header, part of the ATM Adaptation Layer 2
