= D-subminiature (professional audio) =

Type of professional audio connector

D-subminiature connectors are used to carry balanced analog or digital audio on many multichannel professional audio equipment, where the use of XLR connectors is impractical, for example due to space constraints. The most common usage is the DB25, using TASCAM's pinout (now standardised in AES59 by the Audio Engineering Society). To avoid the possibility of bent pins on fixed equipment, the male connector is generally fitted to the cabling and the female connector to the equipment. The DD50 connector usage is described in AES-2id.

DA15
Pin	Quartz Digital	Bluefish Digital
1	Out 1/2 +	In 5/6 +
2	GND	In 3/4 −
3	Out 3/4 +	In 3/4 +
4	GND	In 1/2 −
5	GND	In 1/2 +
6	Out 5/6 +	In 5/6 −
7	GND	Out 5/6 −
8	Out 7/8 +	In 1/2 GND
9	Out 1/2 −	Out 1/2 GND
10	GND	n/c
11	Out 3/4 −	Out 5/6 +
12	GND	Out 3/4 −
13	Out 5/6 −	Out 3/4 +
14	GND	Out 1/2 −
15	Out 7/8 −	Out 1/2 +

DB25
Pin	Yamaha Digital	TASCAM / Digidesign Digital AES59 "Digital combined I/O"	TASCAM Analog AES59 "8-way connections"
1	In 1/2 +	Out 7/8 +	In/Out 8 +
2	In 3/4 +	Out 7/8 GND	In/Out 8 GND
3	In 5/6 +	Out 5/6 −	In/Out 7 −
4	In 7/8 +	Out 3/4 +	In/Out 6 +
5	Out 1/2 +	Out 3/4 GND	In/Out 6 GND
6	Out 3/4 +	Out 1/2 −	In/Out 5 −
7	Out 5/6 +	In 7/8 +	In/Out 4 +
8	Out 7/8 +	In 7/8 GND	In/Out 4 GND
9	n/c	In 5/6 −	In/Out 3 −
10	GND	In 3/4 +	In/Out 2 +
11	n/c	In 3/4 GND	In/Out 2 GND
12	GND	In 1/2 −	In/Out 1 −
13	GND	n/c	n/c
14	In 1/2 −	Out 7/8 −	In/Out 8 −
15	In 3/4 −	Out 5/6 +	In/Out 7 +
16	In 5/6 −	Out 5/6 GND	In/Out 7 GND
17	In 7/8 −	Out 3/4 −	In/Out 6 −
18	Out 1/2 −	Out 1/2 +	In/Out 5 +
19	Out 3/4 −	Out 1/2 GND	In/Out 5 GND
20	Out 5/6 −	In 7/8 −	In/Out 4 −
21	Out 7/8 −	In 5/6 +	In/Out 3 +
22	GND	In 5/6 GND	In/Out 3 GND
23	GND	In 3/4 −	In/Out 2 −
24	GND	In 1/2 +	In/Out 1 +
25	GND	In 1/2 GND	In/Out 1 GND

Lynx AES16(e) Digital I/O Pinout using HD26
Pin	Signal	Pin	Signal	Pin	Signal
1	Clock Gnd	10	Clock		
2	Out Ch 8 −	11	Out Ch 8 +	19	Out Ch 8 GND
3	Out Ch 7 GND	12	Out Ch 7 −	20	Out Ch 7 +
4	Out Ch 6 −	13	Out Ch 6 +	21	Out Ch 6 GND
5	Out Ch 5 GND	14	Out Ch 5 −	22	Out Ch 5 +
6	In Ch 4 −	15	In Ch 4 +	23	In Ch 4 GND
7	In Ch 3 GND	16	In Ch 3 −	24	In Ch 3 +
8	In Ch 2 −	17	In Ch 2 +	25	In Ch 2 GND
9	In Ch 1 GND	18	In Ch 1 −	26	In Ch 1 +

DD50 — AES-2id "High-density AES connections"
Pin	Signal	Pin	Signal	Pin	Signal
1	Chassis				
2	Ch 1 –	18	Ch 1 +	34	Ch 1 GND
3	Ch 2 GND	19	Ch 2 –	35	Ch 2 +
4	Ch 3 –	20	Ch 3 +	36	Ch 3 GND
5	Ch 4 GND	21	Ch 4 –	37	Ch 4 +
6	Ch 5 –	22	Ch 5 +	38	Ch 5 GND
7	Ch 6 GND	23	Ch 6 –	39	Ch 6 +
8	Ch 7 –	24	Ch 7 +	40	Ch 7 GND
9	Ch 8 GND	25	Ch 8 –	41	Ch 8 +
10	Ch 9 –	26	Ch 9 +	42	Ch 9 GND
11	Ch 10 GND	27	Ch 10 –	43	Ch 10 +
12	Ch 11 –	28	Ch 11 +	44	Ch 11 GND
13	Ch 12 GND	29	Ch 12 –	45	Ch 12 +
14	Ch 13 –	30	Ch 13 +	46	Ch 13 GND
15	Ch 14 GND	31	Ch 14 –	47	Ch 14 +
16	Ch 15 –	32	Ch 15 +	48	Ch 15 GND
17	Ch 16 GND	33	Ch 16 –	49	Ch 16 +
				50	Chassis

DD50 — Quartz
Pin	Signal	Pin	Signal	Pin	Signal
1	Ch 1 GND	18	Ch 1 –	34	Ch 1 +
2	Ch 2 +	19	Ch 2 –	35	Ch 2 GND
3	Ch 3 GND	20	Ch 3 –	36	Ch 3 +
4	Ch 4 +	21	Ch 4 –	37	Ch 4 GND
5	Ch 5 GND	22	Ch 5 –	38	Ch 5 +
6	Ch 6 +	23	Ch 6 –	39	Ch 6 GND
7	Ch 7 GND	24	Ch 7 –	40	Ch 7 +
8	Ch 8 +	25	Ch 8 –	41	Ch 8 GND
9	Ch 9 GND	26	Ch 9 –	42	Ch 9 +
10	Ch 10 +	27	Ch 10 –	43	Ch 10 GND
11	Ch 11 GND	28	Ch 11 –	44	Ch 11 +
12	Ch 12 +	29	Ch 12 –	45	Ch 12 GND
13	Ch 13 GND	30	Ch 13 –	46	Ch 13 +
14	Ch 14 +	31	Ch 14 –	47	Ch 14 GND
15	Ch 15 GND	32	Ch 15 –	48	Ch 15 +
16	Ch 16 +	33	Ch 16 –	49	Ch 16 GND
17	GND			50	GND
