= Audio magazine =

Audio magazine may refer to:

- Audio (1947-2000), an American magazine about audio developments and products
- A regularly published series of podcasts obtained by subscription

== See also ==
- Category:Audio periodicals
