= Irvin J. Borowsky =

American publisher and philanthropist

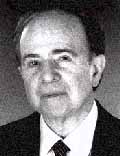
- Born: November 23, 1924; Philadelphia, Pennsylvania
- Died: November 25, 2014 (aged 90)
- Occupations: Publisher, Philanthropist
- Spouse: Laurie Wagman
- Children: 6

Irvin J. Borowsky (November 23, 1924 – November 25, 2014) was an American publisher and philanthropist.

== Early life ==
Irvin J. Borowsky was born to a Jewish family in 1924 in Philadelphia, Pennsylvania, the youngest of the nine children of Emma and Samuel Borowsky. His parents had emigrated from Poland to the United States where Samuel Borowsky became a supplier of flour and related products for bakeries. At twelve years old, the young Borowsky answered an ad in Popular Mechanics for a five dollar printing press. The press came with a package of type, ink, and instructions. It changed his life. At the time of his father's death, Borowsky was fourteen years old and was operating his own printing business which he named City Wide Press.

== Business life ==
At the end of World War II, Borowsky, now a master printer, founded Foster Manufacturing Company to provide custom storage equipment to printers and newspapers throughout the nation. He redesigned the ad makeup departments for the Washington Post, Boston Herald, The Plain Dealer, Philadelphia Inquirer and many other newspapers, farming out the construction of his specially designed steel equipment. In 1948, recognizing the power and potential of the emerging television industry, he started a weekly magazine, TV Digest, which in time became TV Guide. With his Foster Manufacturing Company providing funds, he bought large presses to accommodate the magazine format and the first editions of the magazine were printed - a major event for this new TV field.

He moved his companies to a location that accommodated all three enterprises. City Wide Press, Foster Manufacturing, and TV Digest were now efficiently housed under one roof.

- Borowsky was the first to present movies on television - a shocking concept at the time.
- He was the first to introduce the marketing of magazines at checkout counters in supermarkets – an all new, innovative approach to the public.
- His redesign of numerous newspaper composition departments produced major efficiencies which were adopted by newspapers worldwide.

After selling his TV magazine to Walter Annenberg in 1953, Borowsky founded the North American Publishing Company (NAPCO), which became a highly successful publisher of magazines nationwide. Beginning with Printing Impressions, now the leading publication for the printing and graphic arts industries, Borowsky expanded NAPCO by creating new magazines as well as purchasing and restructuring other publications. His first acquisition was Audio magazine. Within 18 months his stable of magazines included Sailing World, Target Marketing, Magazine and Book Seller, American School and University, American Import/Export Management, In Plant Reproductions, Custom House Guide, Package Printing, and more.

In 1975 Borowsky purchased CUE, the beloved magazine of New York events and entertainment. Calling him a “rebuilder of magazines”, Business Week further noted that Borowsky spent “a fortune” to get CUE in shape. Borowsky moved the magazine to new spaces at 55th Street and Madison Avenue, and North American Publishing Company became a significant presence in New York City. By this time, NAPCO was producing 24 different magazines each month.

By 1980 he had sold several of his magazines: CUE to Rupert Murdoch, Sailing World to the New York Times, and Audio to CBS. His son, Ned, was appointed president of NAPCO and Borowsky announced that he would concentrate his time and resources on philanthropy and social issues.

== Philanthropy and later life ==
In addition to his publishing activities, Borowsky was always immersed in philanthropy plus community services and support. For several years he served as President of the Jewish Exponent, the newspaper that has connected and served the Philadelphia Jewish community for over 100 years. For the Federation of Jewish Charities, he became chairman of the printing and publishing divisions. Borowsky made many visits to Israel, notably during the Yom Kippur War and, on later occasions, for meetings with that nation's leadership.

In 1992, he organized and led 700 Evangelical Christians on a tour that explored cherished early Christian shrines as well as contemporary economic and political issues with leaders from the sciences, technologies, agronomics and education.

In 1982, Borowsky founded the American Interfaith Institute to join Jews and Christians in common cause; to remove anti-Semitic language and incorrect translations of specific passages of the New Testament, thus building understanding, acceptance and relationships among Christians and Jews. Working closely with the scholars and translators of the American Bible Society, Borowsky was able to see the fulfillment of a key goal of the Institute when the Society published the Contemporary English Version (CEV), the first New Testament that does not hold Jews responsible for the crucifixion. Under Borowsky's aegis, the institute has developed a distinguished Scholars’ Board who guide the work and outreach of the organization within a framework of symposia, research, publishing and distribution of teaching materials for professors of religion. Borowsky wrote, edited, and published 18 or more books relating to the mission and work of the institute.

As a member of both the American Academy of Religion and the Society of Biblical Literature, Borowsky lectured worldwide on issues of diversity, faith and cooperation.

In 2000, Borowsky founded the National Liberty Museum, which has welcomed over 500,000 visitors from throughout the world. They come to participate in the museum's programs and exhibitions that address freedom, peace and conflict resolution; to celebrate the diverse heritage and tradition that gives the nation strength and purpose. The Teacher Training Programs and the Education Center of the museum have received plaudits from throughout the educational community and is approved by the Pennsylvania and New Jersey Departments of Education. The contemporary art that is incorporated into every exhibit symbolizes the "art of liberty" and has been noted as one of the most original and effective teaching models in the nation.

Borowsky's philanthropic outreach reflected his personal interest in art, education, and social services. His Board affiliations included the Salvation Army, the University of the Arts (as Vice-Chairman), the Jewish Community Centers and more. He was the major funder of the National Liberty Museum and served as Chairman of that institution, which he founded. His contributions connected him to libraries, schools and the arts. He was the recipient of numerous awards including those from the Salvation Army, University of the Arts (Philadelphia), Printing Industries of America, Ben-Gurion University of the Negev, Foreign Policy Research Institute, United Way, city of Philadelphia, Alliance of Contemporary Glass Art, Federation of Charities, and Boys Town Jerusalem.

In 2013 Borowsky and his wife donated one million dollars to Temple University's Tyler School of Art. The extensive Borowsky Center For Glass Art includes visiting master lectures and serves a large student body.

The Borowsky Glass Studios at the University of The Arts awards an annual international Borowsky Glass Prize.

In 2014 Borowsky received an honorary degree from Drexel University.

== Personal life ==
Borowsky married his second wife, Laurie Wagman in 1979. Including his wife's daughters from her first marriage, they have 6 married children and 13 grandchildren. He died November 25, 2014.
