= Norman C. Pickering =

- Born: Norman Charles Pickering; July 9, 1916; New York, NY
- Died: November 18, 2015 (aged 99); East Hampton, New York
- Education: Newark College of Engineering; Juilliard School
- Occupation: Engineer
- Known for: Pickering pickup

Norman C. Pickering (July 9, 1916 – November 18, 2015) was an American engineer, musical instrument designer, inventor and co-founder of the Audio Engineering Society. His most famous inventions are the modern Pickering magnetic cartridge, a high-fidelity, jewel-tipped phonographic cartridge, and the Pickering pickup. After leaving the audio technology company he founded, Pickering & Company, he developed ultrasound diagnostic techniques, studied violin acoustics, and constructed 37 violins.

== Biography ==
Norman Pickering was born on Long Island on July 9, 1916, in Brooklyn to Herbert Pickering and Elsie Elliott Pickering. His father was a marine engineer, and his mother was a pianist. Norman learned to read music at an early age while sitting at his mother's side, and began playing violin at the age of 7 He was injured while playing baseball, which caused him to switch from violin to French horn. He wanted to study music, but his father, who thought music "was for sissies" asserted that he should study engineering. He graduated from Newark College of Engineering in 1936 with an electrical engineering degree. He then turned back to music, attending Juilliard School on a graduate scholarship. In 1937 he joined the Indianapolis Symphony Orchestra as a French horn player, and was employed there until 1940.

While in Indianapolis he started a recording studio as he was interested in the technical aspects. This work caused the C.G. Conn company to hire him in 1940, where he researched the acoustic properties of their musical instruments. At the beginning of World War II, the Conn facility was converted from manufacturing musical instruments to aircraft instruments for the Sperry Gyroscope Company. Sperry offered Pickering a position which allowed him to return to Long Island. He held this position from 1942 until 1945. While there he played French horn with the Sperry Symphony, but it also generated in Pickering an interest in aircraft, which led him to develop a design for vibration control in Boeing aircraft.

His most famous invention came in 1945 when Pickering, frustrated with the acoustical limitations of sound reproduction from phonograph records, developed a pickup (a device which translates the vibrations of the needle into electrical impulses for amplification) which reduced record wear and significantly increased the accuracy of the sounds coming through the speaker. Pickering felt that phonograph records recorded sound at reasonable levels of fidelity, but that the reproduction standards were not acceptable. Listening to the results from his new device, Pickering felt that the improvement in sound "wasn't just a little, it was magnificent." Further development resulted in the Pickering cartridge. Pickering showed Sumner Hall, who had recorded the Sperry Symphony at a Carnegie Hall concert, some prototypes of his pickup. Hall encouraged development, and Pickering & Co. (later Stanton Magnetics) was started in November 1945. Initially the Pickering apparatus was only marketed for professional use in recording studios and radio stations, but by 1947 it became clear that there was potential in the consumer market. Pickering made his designs for 78 rpm records, and the 1948 introduction of the LP record caught him off-guard. As a result, he had to completely re-work his design.

In 1948, Pickering was among the founders of the Audio Engineering Society. In the 1950s he worked on further improving sound reproduction through tone-arm and variable equalizer modifications. He developed one of the earliest speaker towers. He was a visiting professor of acoustics at City College of New York from 1952 until 1955.

In the 1970s, he was employed at the Southampton Hospital, researching ultrasonic technology, where he developed a method to detect eye diseases. He continued his involvement with music by participating with the Paumanok Ensemble. Later, in the 1980s, he returned to the violin by making instruments, doing consulting work for d'Addario, and as president of The Violin Society of America.

He died at his East Hampton, New York residence, of cancer, on November 18, 2015 at the age of 99.

== Personal life ==
Pickering was married three times. His last marriage was in 1979 to Barbara Goldowsky. He had one daughter, three sons, and two step-sons.
