= John E. Volkmann =

American acoustics expert

John E. Volkmann (1905 in Chicago – July 9, 1980, in Princeton, New Jersey) was a sound engineer and architect.

Volkmann received a BS degree in 1927 and an MS in 1928. He worked his entire professional career at RCA, working on acoustics, large scale loudspeakers and stereophony, writing numerous technical papers and receiving several patents. Among his accomplishments at RCA, Volkmann helped design the Fantasound recording process and theater playback systems for Disney's 1940 Fantasia film.

He was the architect of historical RCA Studio A located on Music Row in Nashville, Tennessee. The building was designed specifically to incorporate the musical techniques of the Nashville Sound. It also is the last remaining gym sized facility of three that he was a principal architect on.

He is cited as receiving an additional professional degree from the University of Illinois in 1940.

He transferred to RCA Laboratories in 1964 and retired from there in 1970. He was, amongst others, responsible for the development and design of the sound systems for the John F. Kennedy Center in Washington D.C.

He was a Fellow of the Society of Motion Picture and Television Engineers (SMPTE), the Acoustical Society of America (ASA), and the Audio Engineering Society (AES). He received the AES Gold Medal in 1966.
