= Audio (magazine) =

American periodical published 1947–2000

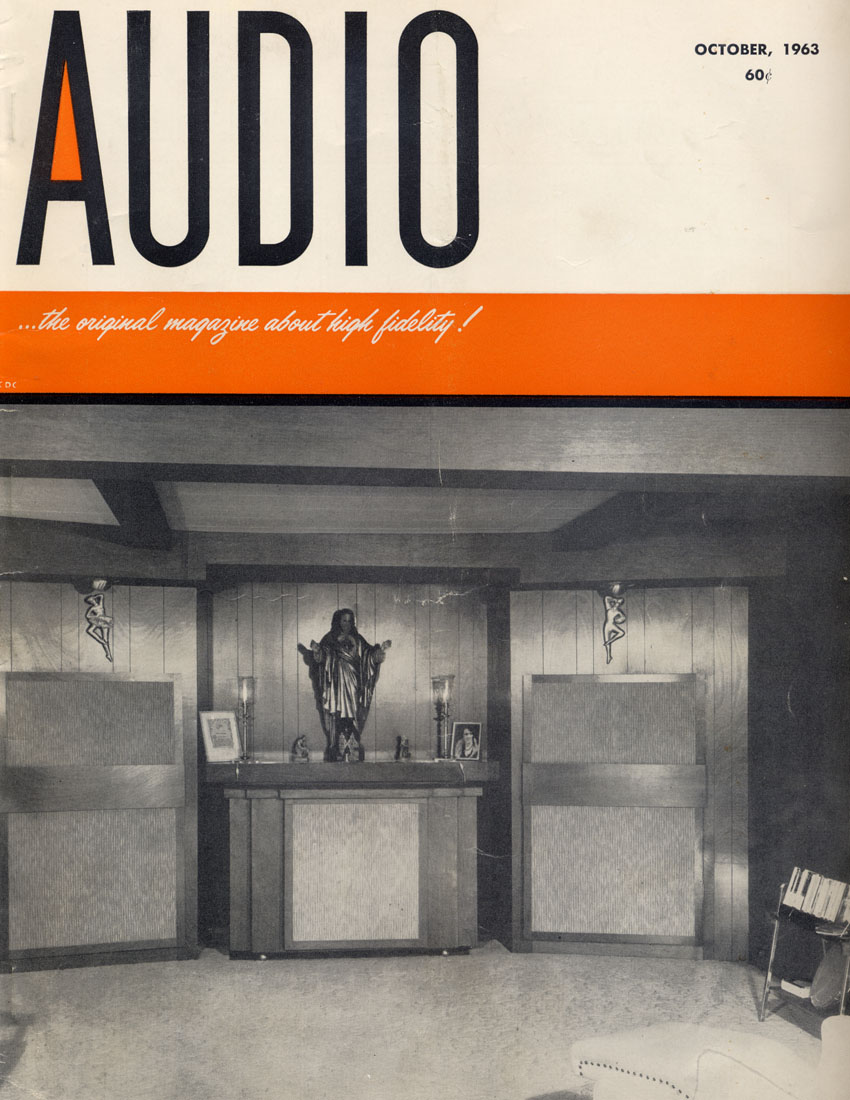
- Cover of Audio, October 1963
- Editor: David Saslaw; Eugene Pitts III; Michael Riggs
- Categories: High-end audio
- Frequency: Monthly
- Founded: 1947
- Final issue: 2000
- Country: United States
- Language: English

Audio magazine was a periodical published from 1947 to 2000. It was America's longest-running audio magazine. Audio published reviews of audio products and audio technology as well as informational articles on topics such as acoustics, psychoacoustics and the art of listening. Audio claimed to be the successor of Radio magazine which was established in 1917. the magazine was based in Philadelphia.

== History ==
Audio began life in Mineola, New York in 1947 as Audio Engineering for the purpose of publishing new developments in audio engineering. In 1948, the Audio Engineering Society (AES) was established and in 1953 they began publishing their definitive, scholarly periodical, the Journal of the Audio Engineering Society. Audio Engineering magazine dropped the word "engineering" in 1954 and shifted to a more consumer- and hobbyist-oriented focus while retaining a serious scientific viewpoint. In 1966, Audio's headquarters were moved to Philadelphia and the periodical was printed by North American Publishing Company.

In 1979, CBS bought Audio from its Philadelphia publisher and moved operations to New York. CBS then bought a group of magazines from Ziff-Davis, including sometime competitor Stereo Review, which soon found itself sharing office space (but not staff) with Audio. In October 1987, Peter Diamandis led a management buyout of the CBS magazine division with 19 magazines with $650 million of financing from Prudential Insurance. Diamandis Communications Inc. soon sold seven magazines for $243 million and in April 1988 sold Audio and the rest of the magazines to Hachette Filipacchi Médias for $712 million. Peter Diamandis remained in control of the magazine group and in 1989 bought competing audio magazine High Fidelity and merged its subscription and advertiser lists with those of Stereo Review, firing High Fidelity's staff and shutting down its printing.

Audio's final appearance was the combined February/March issue in 2000. Hachette Filipacchi Media U.S. group publisher Tony Catalano told reporters that trouble in the high-performance audio sector led to the cancellation of the magazine. Sound & Vision, the successor to Stereo Review, would become the publishing group's sole magazine containing reviews of home audio equipment.

== Contributors and content ==
Eugene "Gene" Pitts III served for more than 22 years as Audio's editor before being replaced in 1995 by Michael Riggs, executive editor of Stereo Review and former editor of High Fidelity, who was then joined in 1999 by Corey Greenberg in an eleventh-hour attempt to revive sagging advertising revenues. Pitts went on to buy The Audiophile Voice in 1995 from The Audiophile Society, a club in the tri-state area around New York City.

Audio magazine was known for its equipment reviews, which were unusual for their concentration on objective measurement and specifications rather than subjective opinion. Audio's contributors included respected audio engineers, many active in AES. Harry F. Olson, Howard A. Chinn, John K. Hilliard, Harvey Fletcher and Hermon Hosmer Scott, all AES Gold Medal awardees, were among the pioneering audio experts who took their discoveries to Audio's pages. Richard Heyser, inventor of time delay spectrometry, wrote articles for Audio in the 1980s including his column Audio's Rosetta Stone. He often reviewed loudspeakers during his short tenure. Don Keele followed Heyser, using TEF analysis in his loudspeaker reviews. Don Davis, founder of Syn-Aud-Con, wrote occasional articles and letters to the editor. Ken Pohlmann, digital audio author and educator, and David Clark, founder of the David Clark company and expert in unbiased double-blind test procedures and originator of the ABX test, wrote articles for Audio.

Herb Horowitz, co-founder of Empire Scientific Corporation wrote an article entitled "Moving Magnet Stereo – The new horizon of stereo disc reproduction" which appeared in the May 1959 issue, in which he discussed the history and engineering benefits of moving-magnet phono cartridges for reproducing stereo vinyl records.

In 1972, Robert W. "Bob" Carver wrote an article about his 700 watt amplifier design, the Phase Linear PL-700. Thereafter, Carver products were often reviewed in the magazine. Bob Carver wrote an article about his development of sonic holography, an experiment in psychoacoustics as applied to loudspeaker physics.

In 1984, a column called "Auricles" appeared, providing purely subjective equipment reviews that did not include performance measurements or emphasize specifications. New contributors who were not engineers were invited to review audio products. After a decade of "Auricles", at least one observer characterized the change in editorial content as an indulgence in "fantasy".
