= Henry E. Roys =

American sound engineer

Henry Edward Roys (Beaver Falls, 1902 – Green Valley, Dec. 6, 1988) was a sound engineer. He graduated from the University of Colorado in 1925 with a BS degree in electrical engineering.

He worked for the most of his professional life for Radio Corporation of America, where he made major contributions to the standardization of product in the record industry.

Roys, a Fellow of the Audio Engineering Society (AES), received its Gold Medal Award in 1973.
