= Daniel R. von Recklinghausen =

American electrical engineer

Daniel R. von Recklinghausen (January 22, 1925, New York City – August 22, 2011) was an electrical engineer.

He graduated from Massachusetts Institute of Technology in 1951 with a Bachelor of Science degree in Electrical Engineering. He was a member of Tau Beta Pi, Sigma Xi, and Eta Kappa Nu fraternities.

Daniel (or DVR as he was known) was recruited straight out of MIT by Hermon Hosmer Scott, who was a professor of electrical engineering at MIT, as a chief research engineer. (However, there was little doubt that DVR was in every sense, the chief engineer.) Von Recklinghausen was immediately put to work on the redesign of the Scott 310 FM tuner. All subsequent tuners, are in electronic terms, "DVR designs." Daniel also worked closely with Fairchild Semiconductors, and made extensive use of its product line, or whatever Robert Noyce suggested might work, as HH Scott transitioned to the use of IC's in its intermediate frequency stages, in mid 1965.

It was the work with Noyce and Fairchild that led to Von Recklinghausen's patent in FET intensification.

As the fortunes of HH Scott declined, Von Recklinghausen's final effort for the company was to design a line of products that could be manufactured in Japan. It was too little, too late to save the company from receivership.

HH Scott Inc., was purchased outright by its Belgian licensee in 1973. (The company was eventually sold to Emerson Electronics.) At that time, Von Recklinghausen began working closely with Advent on the design of the FM tuner that was featured in its popular Advent 300 Receiver.

Von Recklinghausen later worked at Electro Audio Dynamics, beginning in 1973. In 1975, he was appointed Vice President of Research and Development for KLH, where he patented computer controlled loudspeakers. He was a member of the National Stereophonic Radio Committee. He served the Audio Engineering Society (AES) as president in 1967, and was the journal editor from 1991-2004.

Von Recklinghausen was an author of numerous articles and publications, and held 24 patents. He was also an avid photographer.

== Awards ==
- Fellow, Institute of Electrical and Electronics Engineers (IEEE), 1967, for contributions in the field of high fidelity music reproduction (FM Stereo).
- Fellow, Audio Engineering Society, 1962.
- Gold Medal, Audio Engineering Society, 1978, for outstanding achievement and contributions in the field of FM receiver technology.
- Lifetime Achievement award, Audio Engineering Society, 2005.
- Outstanding Young Men of Greater Boston, Boston Junior Chamber of Commerce, 1960.
