= Howard A. Chinn =

American broadcasting engineer

- Howard A. Chinn in 1945
- Born: January 5, 1906; New York, New York, US
- Occupations: Engineer, Author
- Employer: Columbia Broadcasting System

Howard Allen Chinn was an American broadcasting engineer who pioneered techniques of analog audio recording as well as radio and television broadcasting practices. Chinn served as chief audio engineer at Columbia Broadcasting System (CBS) beginning in the 1940s, and authored many magazine articles and books on the technical aspects of audio engineering and broadcasting.

== Early life ==
Chinn was born in New York, New York January 5, 1906, to David L. Chinn from China and Ethel Whinton of New York.

== Education ==
Chinn attended Polytechnic Institute of New York University, later moving to Massachusetts Institute of Technology (MIT) where he earned a bachelor's degree in 1927, and a master's degree in 1929. From 1927 to 1932 he served as a research associate at MIT.

== CBS ==
In 1932, Chinn returned to New York to join Columbia Broadcasting System (CBS) as assistant to the director of engineering. From 1936 forward he was the chief audio engineer. From 1939 to 1941, Chinn appeared as a special lecturer at New York University for graduate studies in electrical engineering.

During World War II, Chinn devoted his energies primarily to war research. For nearly all of 1942 and 1943, he was technical coordinator for the Radio Research Laboratory of Harvard University, funded by the Office of Scientific Research and Development (OSRD). Chinn published a classified report called Enemy Radar Characteristics. From 1944, Chinn served as technical aide then consultant to OSRD.

== Memberships ==
Chinn joined the Institute of Radio Engineers (IRE) in the 1930s and wrote technical papers for publication in the organization's journal. Chinn often wrote for Audio Engineering, a magazine that published technical reports on audio subjects.

Chinn was originally against the founding of the Audio Engineering Society (AES) in 1948. He wrote a letter to the editor of Audio Engineering to say that the proposed formation of AES was unnecessary, as IRE had already formed an Audio and Video Technical Committee. Others did not agree, and when AES did form, Chinn immediately joined. Chinn served on the AES board of governors in 1951. The office was to be held for two years, but Chinn resigned after one "because of the press of work."

== Published works ==
- (1935) Howard Allen Chinn and Charles W. Horn, Broadcast Transmission Developments and Progress During 1934, Proceedings of the IRE, Volume 23, Number 5.
- (1940) H.A. Chinn, D.K. Gannett, R.M. Morris. A New Standard Volume Indicator and Reference Level, Proceedings of the IRE, Volume 28.
- (1943) Enemy Radar Characteristics. Harvard University.
- (1945) H.A. Chinn, P. Eisenberg, Tonal-Range and Sound-Intensity Preferences of Broadcast Listeners, Proceedings of the IRE, Volume 33, Issue 9. ISSN 0096-8390
- (1946) Radio Alphabet: A Glossary of Radio Terms, Hastings House, New York. Copyright CBS. Editors: Paul Kesten, Paul Hollister, Robert Strunsky, Douglas Coulter, William Lodge, William Gittinger, William Ackerman, John Churchill, Elmo Wilson, Gilbert Seldes, Howard Chinn, Earle McGill, Davidson Taylor, Lyman Bryson
- (1947) H.A. Chinn, Philip Eisenberg, New CBS Program Transmission Standards, Proceedings of the IRE, Volume 35.
- (1948) Audio System Design Fundamentals, Audio Engineering, Volume 32, Number 11, pp. 11–12.
- (1948) AES E-Library: How It All Began, Reprinted from Audio, 1948 by Sherry, Jr., Frank E.; LeBel, C. J.; Pickering, Norman C.; Salmon, Vincent; Hartley, Jack; Chinn, Howard A.; West, William P.
- (1951) Measurement of Audio Volume, Audio Engineering, Two-part series, September and October, 1951.
- (1952) The measurement of audio volume. AES paper.
- (1953) Television broadcasting, McGraw-Hill.
- (1953) Rudy Bretz and Howard A. Chinn, Techniques of Television Production, McGraw-Hill.
- (1954) Chinn, H.A., O'Brien, R.S., Monroe, R.B., Fish, P.E. CBS Television City Technical Facilities, Proceedings of the IRE, Volume 42, Issue 7. ISSN 0096-8390

== Awards ==
- (1950) John H. Potts Award (now the Gold Medal), the highest accolade from the AES, "for outstanding achievement in the field of audio engineering".
- (1968) NAB Engineering Achievement Award, awarded by the National Association of Broadcasters (NAB) to Howard A. Chinn, director, general engineering; CBS Television Network; New York, New York.
