= William B. Snow =

Sound engineer (1903-1968)

William B. Snow (San Francisco, 16 May 1903 – 5 October 1968) was a sound engineer. He graduated from the Stanford University in 1923 with a B. S. degree in electrical engineering.

He worked for Bell Labs, where he made major contributions to acoustics from 1923–1940. During the Second World War, he was assistant director of the US Navy's Underwater Sound Laboratory.

Snow, a Fellow of the Audio Engineering Society (AES), received its Gold Medal Award in 1968.
