= Nashville sound =

Subgenre of country music

- Stylistic origins: Country; traditional pop
- Cultural origins: 1950s, Nashville, Tennessee, United States
- Derivative forms: Countrypolitan; country pop

Other topics
- List of country musicians; list of years in country music; The Nashville A-Team

The Nashville sound is a subgenre of American country music that originated in the 1950s in Nashville, Tennessee. It sought to replace rough honky tonk music with "smooth strings and choruses", "sophisticated background vocals" and "smooth tempos" associated with traditional pop.

Several factors contributed to the rise of the Nashville sound, including the death of Hank Williams in 1953, who's absence from country music saw an abandonment of the honky tonk and yodeling style that he associated with–in favor of more polished recordings. The rise of rock and roll in the 1950s also hurt country sales, and the Nashville sound was cited as an attempt "to revive country sales, which had been devastated by the rise of rock 'n' roll".

In 1995, Waylon Jennings reflected on the Nashville sound, referring to it as "assembly line music" that restricted the freedom of recording artists. This disconnect between artists and the Nashville establishment would ultimately give rise to the outlaw country movement in the 1970s.

== Characteristics ==
According to Dave Lifton of Ultimate Classic Rock, the Nashville sound "had more in common with mainstream 50s vocal pop than Western swing or rockabilly." Upon being asked what the Nashville sound was, Chet Atkins put his hand into his pocket, shook his loose change, and said "That's what it is. It's the sound of money."

== Origins ==
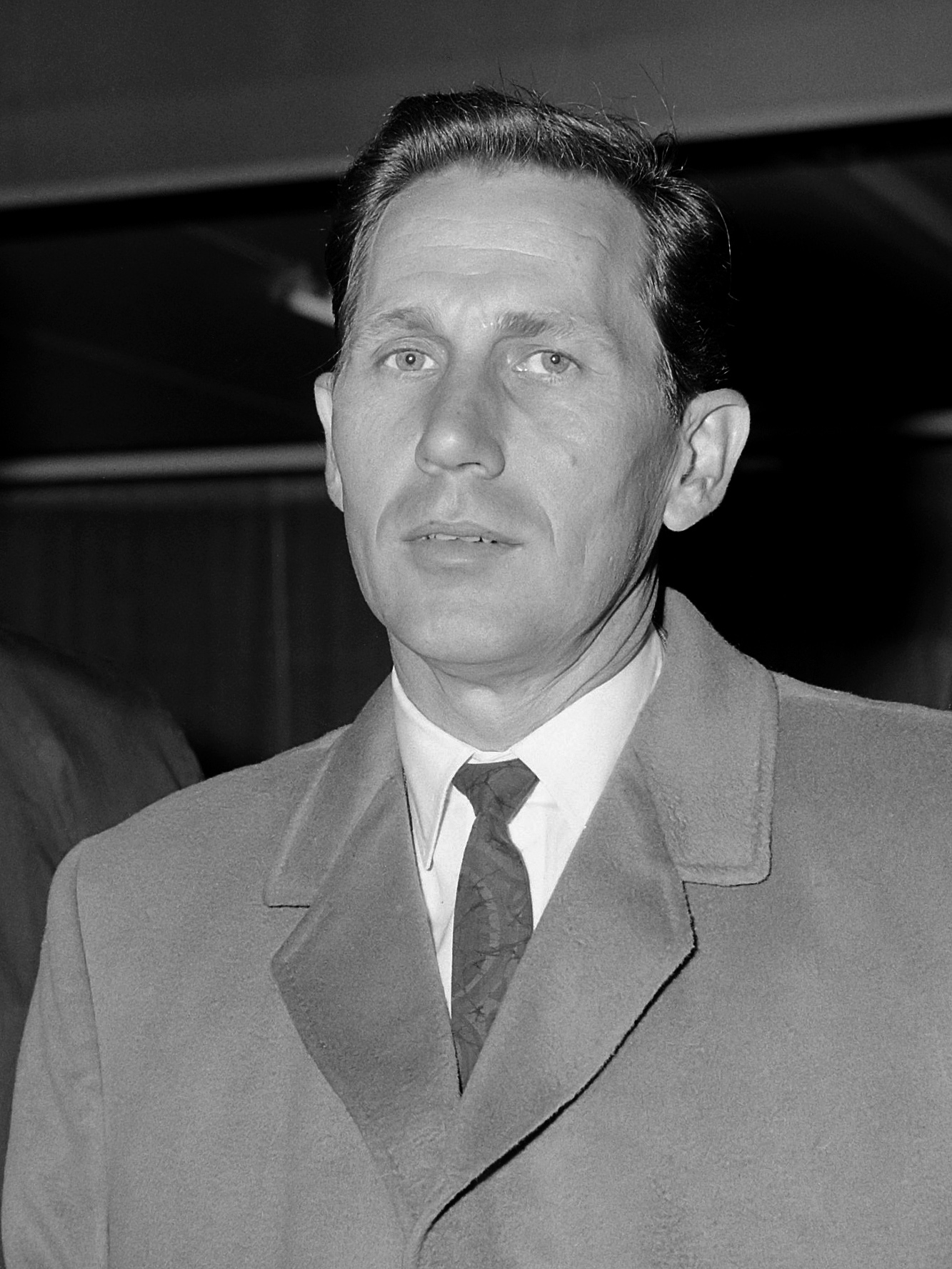
Chet Atkins in 1965

The Nashville sound was pioneered by staff at RCA Victor, Columbia Records and Decca Records in Nashville, Tennessee. RCA Victor manager, producer and musician Chet Atkins, and producers Steve Sholes, Owen Bradley and Bob Ferguson, and recording engineer Bill Porter invented the form by replacing elements of the popular honky tonk style (fiddles, steel guitar, nasal lead vocals) with "smooth" elements from 1950s pop music (string sections, background vocals, crooning lead vocals), and using "slick" production, and pop music structures. The producers relied on a small group of studio musicians known as the Nashville A-Team, whose quick adaptability and creative input made them vital to the hit-making process. The Anita Kerr Quartet was the main vocal backing group in the early 1960s.

The term "Nashville sound" was first mentioned in an article about Jim Reeves in 1958 in the Music Reporter and again in 1960 in a Time article about Reeves. Other observers have identified several recordings that helped establish the early Nashville sound. The country historian Rich Kienzle identified that "Gone", a Ferlin Husky hit recorded in November 1956, as a possible precursor. The writer Colin Escott argued that Reeves' "Four Walls", recorded February 1957, as the "first 'Nashville sound' record", and Chet Atkins, the RCA Victor producer and guitarist most often credited with being the sound's primary artistic creator, pointed to his production of Don Gibson's "Oh Lonesome Me" later the same year. In an essay published in Heartaches by the Number: Country Music's 500 Greatest Singles, David Cantwell argues that Elvis Presley's rock and roll recording of "Don't Be Cruel" in July 1956 was the record that sparked the beginning of the era now called the Nashville sound.

Regarding the Nashville sound, the record producer Owen Bradley stated

"Now we've cut out the fiddle and steel guitar and added choruses to country music. But it can't stop there. It always has to keep developing to keep fresh."

Bradley Studios, RCA Studio B and later RCA Studio A, located directly center of Music Row, were considered pivotal as well as essential locations to the development of the Nashville sound musical techniques. RCA Studio A specifically was designed and built to incorporate these techniques and was designed by RCA's sound engineer John E. Volkmann. In 1960, Time reported that Nashville had "nosed out Hollywood as the nation's second biggest (after New York) record-producing center."

== Countrypolitan ==
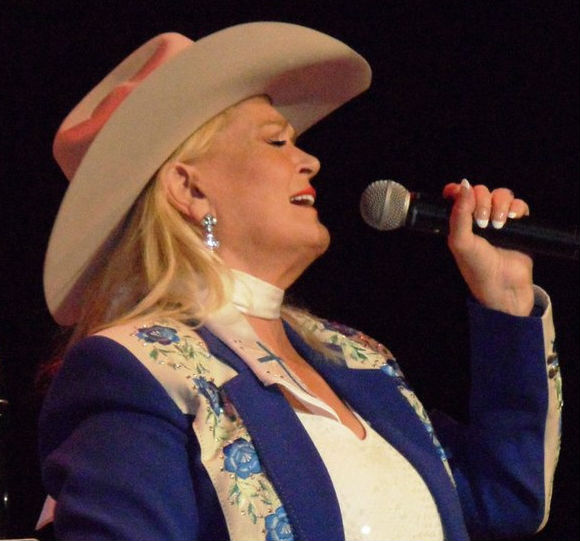
Lynn Anderson

In the early 1960s, the Nashville sound began to be challenged by the rival Bakersfield sound on the country side and by the British Invasion on the pop side; compounding these problems were the sudden deaths, in separate airplane crashes, of Patsy Cline and Jim Reeves, two of the Nashville sound's biggest stars. Nashville's pop song structure became more pronounced, and it morphed into what was called countrypolitan: a smoother sound typified through the use of lush string arrangements with a real orchestra and often background vocals provided by a choir. Countrypolitan was aimed straight at mainstream markets, and its music sold well through the later 1960s into the mid-1970s. Among the architects of this sound were producers Billy Sherrill (who was instrumental in shaping Tammy Wynette's early career) and Glenn Sutton. Artists who typified the countrypolitan sound initially included Wynette, Charlie Rich, and Charley Pride, along with Los Angeles–based singers Lynn Anderson and Glen Campbell. George Jones's style of the era successfully fused the countrypolitan sound with the honky-tonk style that had made him famous.

The Bakersfield sound, and later outlaw country, dominated country music among aficionados while countrypolitan reigned on the pop charts.

== Country pop ==
By the late 1970s and 1980s, many pop music singers picked up the countrypolitan style and created what is known as country pop, the fusion of country music and pop music.

== See also ==
- The Nashville A-Team
- Nashville Sounds, a baseball team that borrows its name from the style
