= AES64 =

The AES coarse-groove calibration discs (AES-S001-064) are a boxed set of two identical discs, one for routine use, one for master reference. The intent is to characterize the reproduction chain for the mass transfer of coarse-groove records to digital media, much like using a photographic calibration reference in image work.

Libraries and archives around the world have collections of many thousands of coarse-groove mechanical audio recordings, phonograph or gramophone records, largely 78s or 78 revolutions per minute (rpm) discs. This is a substantial recorded heritage of mankind's music and spoken word made over a period of 65 years. The 78 rpm disc was largely out of production by 1960. These mechanical recordings won't be available indefinitely since the plastics used in their manufacture are deteriorating slowly but steadily. Preservation programs have been underway by a number of organizations. Decreasing costs of digital storage media now make it possible to consider all mechanical audio recordings for transfer to the digital domain. Thus a widespread need was recognized by the Audio Engineering Society (AES) to provide a calibration tool for standard transfer of mechanical coarse-groove audio recordings from the analog to the digital domain.

== Specifications ==
Side A:

Gliding tone, 20 Hz to 20 kHz
Speed: 77.92 rpm
Lateral (mono) coarse groove
Time constants: 3180/450/0 ms
Separate outer & inner bands:

1 kHz trigger tone
Gliding tone, 20 Hz to 20 kHz
1 kHz reference level*
*20 mm Light Band Width (LBW);
approx 8 cm/s peak-to-peak, 5.7 cm/s rms

Side B:

Single tones, 18kHz to 30 Hz
Speed: 77.92 rpm
Lateral (mono) coarse groove
Time constants: 3180/450/50 ms

(Pressed under license from EMI Records Ltd.)

== A Closer Look At The Preservation Problem ==
According to Ted Kendall, maker of the Front End audio restoration unit also known as "The Mousetrap", the equalization time constants for post-1955 78s used in the Front End are 3180/450/50 ms. These time constants are identical to those used in the AES Coarse-groove Calibration Discs. Since the 78 rpm record would be obsolete by 1960, this means that there is a very large population of pre-1955 78s requiring different equalization settings depending on the vintage and label of the disc.

Type of Recording: Equalizer Settings
Acoustic recordings (pre-1925): Flat/AC/AC
FFRR 78s: Flat/636/25
EMI 78s 1945-1955: Flat/636/Flat
Most other UK 78s 1925-1945: Flat/531/Flat
Post-1955 78s: 3180/450/50
BBC direct recordings 1945-1960: Flat/BBC/BBC
CCIR standard coarse-groove transcriptions: Flat/450/50
AES (some early US Lps): Flat/400/63.6
Modern LPs (RIAA equalization): 3180/318/75
Lateral cut NAB transcriptions: 2250/250/100
Vertical cut NAB transcriptions: Flat/531/40*
Western Electric 78s: Flat 531/Flat*

- Adjustments needed*

So, the dilemma is this: should coarse-groove recordings be transferred in mass to digital using an arbitrary phonoequalization curve such as with the AES calibration discs, or should each recording be matched to the curve appropriate to its vintage and label, then transferred to digital media?

== Use of RIAA Equalization ==
Because the RIAA equalization standard has been in use internationally for phonograph records since 1953 and is based on recording practices used for many years by RCA Victor, a dominant record producer, the electronics needed for this purpose are as readily available as record players are. For vintage recordings the Esoteric Sound Re-Equalizer can readily be connected as a standard item to the record playback equipment. The Re-Equalizer is used to modify RIAA. Then, depending on the vintage and label of the 78 rpm record, the appropriate equalizer bass turnover and treble rolloff settings can be easily looked up in a reference guide.

== Other Equipment ==
Another approach to obtaining the right phonograph record equalization settings for transferring vintage recordings to digital media is to use the Chronologic Equalizer in the Souvenir Vintage Sound Processor – MK-2 made by K-A-B Electronics.

Equalizer Setting
AC: Acoustic recordings
AE: Early electric recordings; Victor (some 1925), Columbia (1925), and most European to 1955
E3: Recordings with a 300 Hz turnover; Columbia (1925-1938), and FRR to 1955
E5: Recordings with a 500 Hz turnover; Victor (most 1925-1952)
E7: Recordings with a 700 Hz turnover (some NBC Orthacoustic transcriptions)
CO: Columbia 78 curve (1938 to 1955)
TR: Transcriptions (NAB)
MO: RIAA equalization
