= Herb Horowitz =

American audio engineer and executive (died 1985)

- Born: New York
- Died: 1985
- Occupations: Audio Engineer and Executive
- Known for: High Fidelity innovations

Herb Horowitz (died 1985) was an American “audio pioneer” who helped shape the modern high-fidelity industry from the 1950s to the 1980s. Horowitz’s career included engineering, product development, manufacturing, and executive roles at several major high fidelity companies. He helped found and later led Empire Scientific Corporation and held executive posts at Harman International, Acoustic Research, and Rotel, and served as the president of the Institute of High Fidelity.

According to Fidelity Magazine, he “laid the foundations for much of what we take for granted in hi-fi today.”

== Career ==
Horowitz began his audio career in 1954 as chief engineer for audio products at CBS Columbia. He worked with Peter Carl Goldmark to develop phonograph equipment and cartridge tape units.

In 1956, he moved to Electrosonic Sound Laboratories (ESL), the U.S. marketer of Ortofon cartridges, where he served as chief engineer. A 1959 Audio magazine item, stated that during his work at CBS/Columbia and ESL he was "responsible for a number of outstanding advances in the design of high fidelity components."

In 1958, Horowitz helped found the Empire Scientific Corporation, a designer and manufacturer of high fidelity equipment and was president of Empire’s high fidelity division

While at Empire, Horowitz led the development of two and four-channel phono cartridges; In a review of the Empire 880P phono cartridge published in the May 1963 issue of High Fidelity Magazine it was called “probably the best magnetic cartridge we have tested to date.”

After Horowitz was appointed president of Empire the company conducted lab testing of its long-playing cartridges to ensure extended use would protect the sound quality of recordings. He introduced the idea of providing technical advice in lay terms for consumers of audio equipment. In 1973, following the development of Empire’s weatherproof speakers, Horowitz predicted that speakers would be encased in molded plastic rather than wooden cabinets; Horowitz told The Plain Dealer “You don’t have to kill a tree to build a molded speaker enclosure that has great acoustic properties.”

Under Horowitz, Empire became known for its high-end hi-fi products and became “one of the leading home entertainment manufacturers in the U.S.” Horowitz was called an “audio industry pioneer” by Electronics Australia.

In 1975 he left Empire to become director of special projects at Harman International. and then in 1977, Horowitz moved to Teledyne to run the acoustic research and revitalize the AR brand, which had once been one of the most successful loudspeaker lines but had declined in popularity. While at Teledyne, Horowitz headed a four-year market research survey that identified a need for lower-cost hi-fi speakers and led to development of a new product line priced beneath $200.

In his later career, Horowitz served as president of Rotel of America, a manufacturer of high end stereo equipment, at the time, and as a consultant on international affairs for the audio equipment company Cerwin-Vega.

Horowitz died in 1985.

== Key predictions and demonstrations ==
In May 1959 he wrote a major article in Audio magazine in which he laid out his perspective that stereo would become the mainstay of the industry (vs mono) and detailed some of the engineering efforts that went into it. This article was considered a milestone.

In 1963 Horowitz predicted that the four-channel pickup, otherwise known as quadrophonic surround sound would replace two-channel, or stereophonic sound in popularity.

Horowitz had a sense for marketing and attracting attention which was demonstrated when appeared at a 1961 hi-fi trade show in Philadelphia and set up a display where Empire Troubador turntables played upside down and suspended from the ceiling - and this to demonstrate their balanced playback. In online forums people still remember this stunt and discuss it. For example, in 2023"If so, the Empire folks (headed by Herb Horowitz*) went to the extreme trouble of constructing upside-down shelves stacked with glued-on little boxes and dipping the "suspending" chains in molten metal or glue to complete the illusion.. " or, in 2024, "Herb Horowitz was a really smart guy and I think that he rigged it. There were many such demos of so-called "dynamically balanced" arms and no one thought about flying platters."

== Other activities ==
Horowitz served as president of the Institute of High Fidelity, an audio industry organization, from 1972 to 1975.

== See Also ==
Jonathan Scull, Master of Sound: Herb Horowitz and the Dawn of Audio
