= Tascam Digital Interface =

The Tascam Digital Interface (TDIF) is a proprietary format connector defined by TASCAM that is unbalanced and uses a 25-pin D-sub cable to transmit and/or receive up to eight channels of digital audio between compatible devices. Unlike the ADAT lightpipe connection, TDIF uses a bidirectional connection, meaning that only one cable is required to connect the eight ins and outs of one device or another.

The Initial specification available to implementers was called TDIF-1 Version 1.0.

The first product with this connector was the TASCAM DA-88. That implementation did not include the ability to derive a word clock synchronization between the DA-88 and another TDIF-1 device, so a BNC WORD CLOCK connection was required as well.(cite: DA-88 users manual) Later TASCAM products included the ability to sync to the TDIF-1 connection, although that still excluded the DA-88. (cite:DA-38 users manual). Other manufacturers vary in their completeness of implementation.

The signal labelled "word clock" in the TDIF-1 spec is delayed 270 degrees (90 degrees advanced) with respect to the word clock visible from the BNC word clock output. This is because the TDIF-1 spec was derived from the digital audio transmitter of the NEC uPD6381 DSP used in the DA-88.

The TDIF-1 Version 1.1 specification includes parity and other channel information bits. TDIF-1 Version 2.0 includes specification for double speed and quad speed (e.g. 96 kHz and 192 kHz) rates at reduced channel counts.

The TASCAM X-48 supports 96 kHz at full channel count over 6 TDIF-1 connectors, using a post Version 2.0 specification.

== See also ==
- Digital Tape Recording System
