= AES11 =

The AES11 standard published by the Audio Engineering Society provides a systematic approach to the synchronization of digital audio signals. AES11 recommends using an AES3 signal to distribute audio clocks within a facility. In this application, the connection is referred to as a Digital Audio Reference Signal (DARS).

Further recommendations are made concerning the accuracy of sample clocks as embodied in the interface signal and the use of this format as a convenient synchronization reference where signals must be rendered co-timed for digital processing. Synchronism is defined, and limits are given which take account of relevant timing uncertainties encountered in an audio studio.

== Related developments ==
AES11 Annex D (in the November 2005 or later printing or version) shows an example method to provide isochronous timing relationships for distributed AES3 structures over asynchronous networks such as AES47 where reference signals may be locked to common timing sources such as GPS.

In addition, the Audio Engineering Society has now published a related standard called AES53, that specifies how the timing markers already specified in AES47 may be used to associate an absolute time-stamp with individual audio samples. This may be closely associated with AES11 and used to provide a way of aligning streams from disparate sources, including synchronizing audio to video in networked structures.

The media profile defined in annex A of AES67 provides a means of using AES11 synchronization via the Precision Time Protocol.
