= Ensoniq Paris =

Digital audio workstation

Ensoniq Paris was a digital audio workstation available for PCs and Macintosh computers, sold by Ensoniq Corporation in 1998 and later by E-mu Systems. It was a combination of software and hardware providing its user the tools to record, edit and mix audio material in a professional environment, similar to the way that Pro Tools work. The software part which consisted of a multitrack audio sequencer, a virtual mixing console and various digital effects was developed by Intelligent Devices.

The basic system consisted of the PARIS cross-platform software, EDS-1000 a pci card with 6 on-board DSP processors, and Control 16 a dedicated hardware control surface. The pci card had to be connected to one of the three available interfaces which provided analog and digital inputs and outputs to the system. Multiple EDS-1000 cards could be installed in a computer to increase the number of audio input/output and the power of DSP processing.
