= Unique Material Identifier =

SMPTE standard for label on media files

The Unique Material Identifier (UMID) is a SMPTE standard for providing a stand-alone method for generating a unique label designed to be used to attach to media files and streams. The UMID is standardized in SMPTE 330M.

There are two types of UMID:

Basic UMID
contains the minimal components necessary for the unique identification (the essential metadata) The length of the basic UMID is 32 octets.

The Extended UMID
provides information on the creation time and date, recording location and the name of the organisation and the maker as well as the components of the Basic UMID. The length of the Extended UMID is 64 octets. This data may be parsed to extract specific information produced at the time it was generated or simply used as a unique label.
