= ATM adaptation layer =

The use of Asynchronous Transfer Mode (ATM) technology and services creates the need for an adaptation layer in order to support information transfer protocols, which are not based on ATM. This adaptation layer defines how to segment higher-layer packets into cells and the reassembly of these packets. Additionally, it defines how to handle various transmission aspects in the ATM layer.

Examples of services that need adaptations are Gigabit Ethernet, IP, Frame Relay, SONET/SDH, UMTS/Wireless, etc.

The main services provided by AAL (ATM Adaptation Layer) are:

- Segmentation and reassembly
- Handling of transmission errors
- Handling of lost and misinserted cell conditions
- Timing and flow control

The following ATM Adaptation Layer protocols (AALs) have been defined by the ITU-T. It is meant that these AALs will meet a variety of needs. The classification is based on whether a timing relationship must be maintained between source and destination, whether the application requires a constant bit rate, and whether the transfer is connection oriented or connectionless.

== AAL Type 0 ==
AAL Type 0 (also referred as raw cells) consists of 48 bytes of payload without any reservation for special fields.

== AAL Type 1 ==
AAL Type 1 supports constant bit rate (CBR), synchronous, connection oriented traffic. Examples include T1 (DS1), E1, and x64 kbit/s emulation. It is used for transmitting Class A network traffic, that is, real-time, constant bit rate, connection oriented traffic (example- uncompressed audio and video). Bits are fed in by the application at constant rate and must be delivered to other end with minimum delay, jitter or overhead. The input is stream of bits without message boundaries. For this traffic, error detection protocols cannot be used since timeouts and retransmission causes delay but the missing cells are reported to the application, that must take its own action to recover from them.

== AAL Type 2 ==
AAL Type 2 supports time-dependent Variable Bit Rate (VBR-RT) of connection-oriented, synchronous traffic. Examples include Voice over ATM. AAL2 is also widely used in wireless applications due to the capability of multiplexing voice packets from different users on a single ATM connection.

== AAL Type 3/4 ==
AAL Type 3/4 supports VBR, data traffic, connection-oriented, asynchronous traffic (e.g. X.25 data) or connectionless packet data (e.g. SMDS traffic) with an additional 4-byte header in the information payload of the cell. Examples include Frame Relay and X.25.

== AAL Type 5 ==
AAL Type 5 is similar to AAL 3/4 with a simplified information header scheme. This AAL assumes that the data is sequential from the end user and uses the Payload Type Indicator (PTI) bit to indicate the last cell in a transmission. Examples of services that use AAL 5 are classic IP over ATM, Ethernet Over ATM, SMDS, and LAN Emulation (LANE). AAL 5 is a widely used ATM adaptation layer protocol. This protocol was intended to provide a streamlined transport facility for higher-layer protocols that are connection oriented.

AAL 5 was introduced to:

- reduce protocol processing overhead.
- reduce transmission overhead.
- ensure adaptability to existing transport protocols.

The AAL 5 was designed to accommodate the same variable bit rate, connection-oriented asynchronous traffic or connectionless packet data supported by AAL 3/4, but without the segment tracking and error correction requirements.

Class A	Class B	Class X	Class C	Class D
Circuit emulation	Compressed video	Cell relay	Bursty data	Datagram service
constant Bit Rate	Variable Bit Rate	VBR	VBR	VBR
Timing Required	Timing Required	Timing Not Required	Timing Not Required	Timing Not Required
Connection Oriented	Connection Oriented	Connection Oriented	Connection Oriented	Connection less
AAL 1	AAL 2	AAL 0	AAL 3/4	AAL --3/4 & AAL 5
