= TOSLINK =

Standardized optical fiber digital audio interconnect

TOSLINK / EIAJ optical
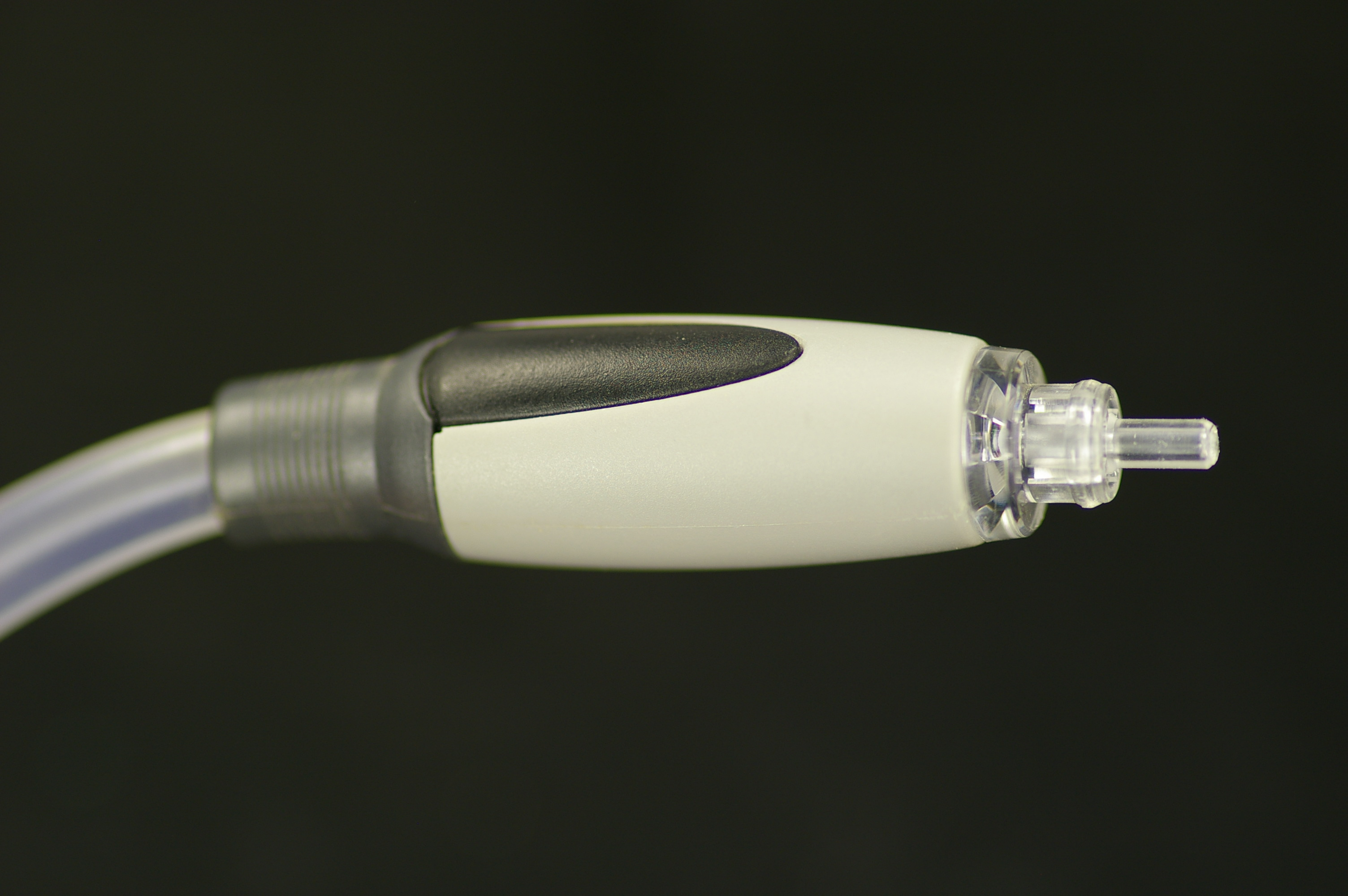
- Clear TOSLINK cable with a round connector for S/PDIF connectivity
- Type: Optical digital audio connector

Production history
- Designer: Toshiba
- Designed: 1983
- Manufacturer: Toshiba
- Produced: Since 1983

General specifications
- Hot pluggable: Yes
- External: Yes
- Audio signal: S/PDIF bitstream. Originally limited to 48 kHz at 20 bits PCM. Extended by manufacturers to support additional formats.
- Cable: Optical fiber, ~10 m (33 ft) maximum
- Pins: 1
- Connector: JIS F05 (JIS C5974-1993 F05)

Data
- Width: Serial
- Bitrate: 3.1 Mbit/s (S/PDIF, 48 kHz PCM); 15 Mbit/s (common TORX147 receiver); 125 Mbit/s (automotive, 2003)
- Max. devices: 1
- Protocol: Serial

TOSLINK (Toshiba Link) is a standardized optical fiber connector system. Generically known as optical audio, the most common use of the TOSLINK optical fiber connector is in consumer audio equipment in which the digital optical socket carries (transmits) a stream of digital audio signals from audio equipment (CD player, DVD player, Digital Audio Tape recorder, computer, video game console) to an AV receiver that can decode two channels of uncompressed, pulse-code modulated (PCM) audio; or decode compressed 5.1 surround sound audio signals, such as Dolby Digital and DTS. Unlike an HDMI connector cable, a TOSLINK optical fiber connector does not possess the bandwidth capacity to carry the uncompressed audio signals of Dolby TrueHD and of DTS-HD Master Audio, but it can carry up to 8 channels of PCM audio when used to connect two devices that use the ADAT Lightpipe standard.

Although the TOSLINK connector supports several media formats and physical standards, the most common digital audio connectors are the rectangular EIAJ/JEITA RC-5720 (also CP-1201 and JIS C5974-1993 F05). In a TOSLINK connector, the optical signal appears as a red light, with a peak wavelength of 650 nm. Depending on the type of modulated signal being carried, other optical wavelengths can be present.

== History ==
Toshiba originally created TOSLINK to connect their CD players to the receivers they manufactured, for PCM audio streams. The data-link layer is based on the Sony/Philips Digital Interface (S/PDIF), while the hardware layer utilizes a fiber optic transmission system, rather than the electrical (copper) hardware layer of S/PDIF. TOSLINK was soon adopted by manufacturers of most CD players. It can often be found on video sources (DVD and Blu-ray players, cable boxes and game consoles) to connect the digital audio stream to Dolby Digital/DTS decoders.

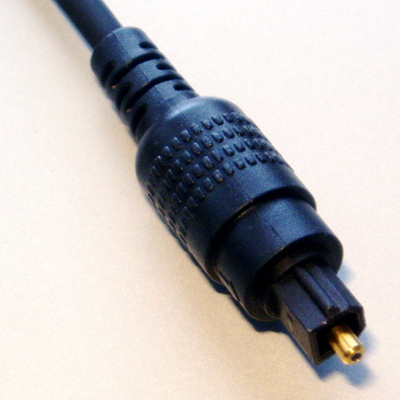
TOSLINK connector (JIS F05)

Although the generic name for the connector is the EIAJ optical, the trade name TOSLINK is a registered trademark of the Toshiba electronics company, derived from TOShiba-LINK; other etymological variations include TOSlink, TosLink, and Tos-link.

The ADAT Lightpipe (ADAT Optical) uses an optical transmission system similar to that of the TOSLINK connector used in the professional recording of music and in the audio component industry. The ADAT Lightpipe connector format uses the same JIS F05 connectors as the TOSLINK connector; the ADAT Lightpipe data format is incompatible with S/PDIF.

== Properties and problems ==
Due to their high attenuation of light, the effective range of plastic optical cables is limited to 5–10 m. They can temporarily fail or be permanently damaged if tightly bent. Although less commonly available and more expensive than plastic optical fiber (POF) cables, glass or silica optical fibers have lower losses and can extend the range of the TOSLINK system.

Optical cables have galvanic isolation, thus are not susceptible to electrical problems such as ground loops, RF interference, ESD events.

== Design ==
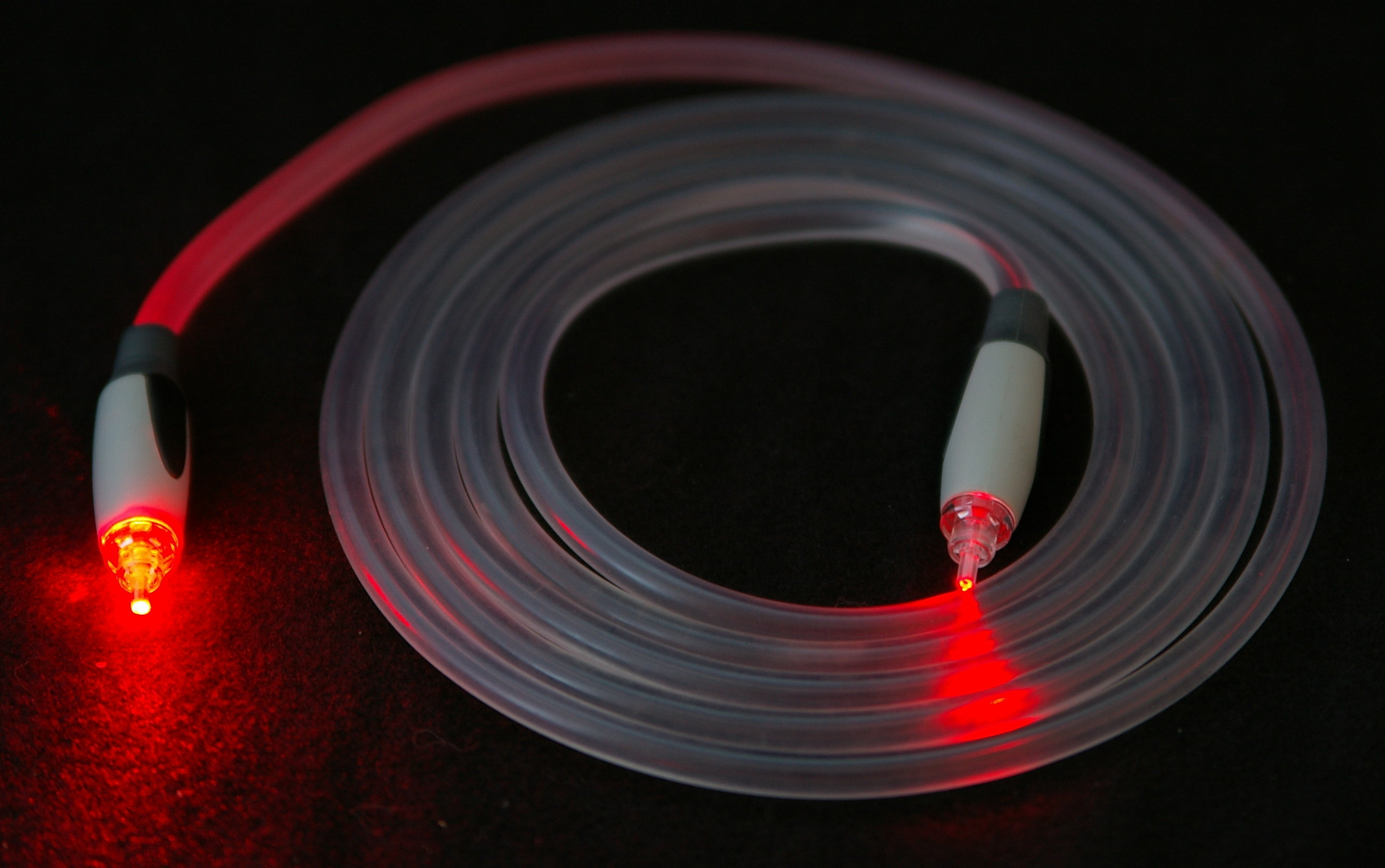
A TOSLINK fiber optic audio cable being illuminated by a laser on the left end

Several types of fiber can be used for TOSLINK: inexpensive 1 mm plastic optical fiber, higher-quality multistrand plastic optical fibers, or quartz glass optical fibers, depending on the desired bandwidth and application. TOSLINK cables are usually limited to 5 meters in length, with a technical maximum of 10 meters, for reliable transmission without the use of a signal booster or a repeater. However, it is very common for interfaces on newer consumer electronics (satellite receivers and PCs with optical outputs) to easily run over 30 meters on even low-cost (0.82 USD/m 2009) TOSLINK cables. TOSLINK transmitters operate at a nominal optical wavelength of 650 nm.

=== Mini-TOSLINK ===
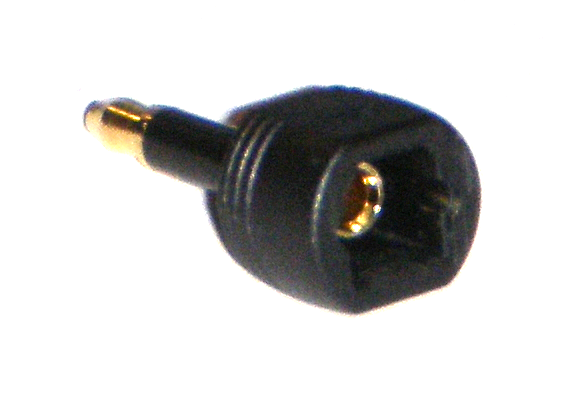
A mini-TOSLINK adapter

Mini-TOSLINK is a standardized optical fiber connector smaller than the standard square TOSLINK connector commonly used in larger consumer audio equipment. The plug is almost the same size and shape as the ubiquitous 3.5 mm T(R)S connector. Adapters are available to connect a full-size TOSLINK plug to a mini-TOSLINK socket. Combined 3.5 mm jack and mini-TOSLINK sockets exist, which can accept a 3.5 mm or mini-TOSLINK plug; mini-TOSLINK plugs and sockets are made 0.5 mm longer than electrical jack plugs so that the latter are too short to touch and damage the LED of a mini-TOSLINK capable socket. Many discontinued laptop computer and portable digital audio equipment models, such as the Google Chromecast Audio device, Apple AirPort Express, and iPod Hi-Fi, as well as some MiniDisc recorders, use these connectors that allow for the insertion of 3.5 mm analog (electrical) headphone output, microphone input, or mini-TOSLINK digital (optical) output (or input, in the case of MiniDisc recorders).
