= S/PDIF =

Standardized digital audio interface

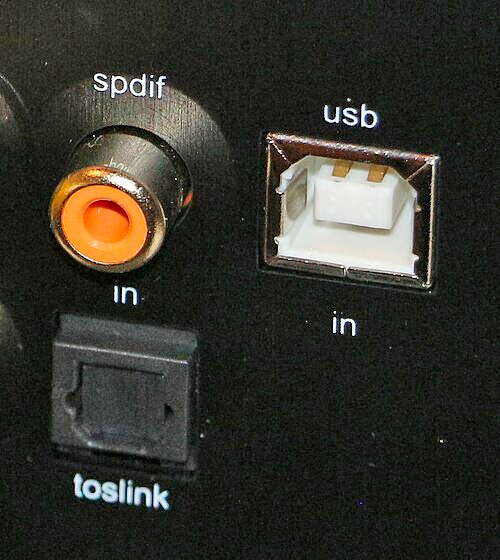
S/PDIF and TOSLINK connectors on a piece of audio equipment

S/PDIF (Sony/Philips Digital Interface) is a type of digital audio interface used in consumer audio equipment to output audio over relatively short distances. The signal is transmitted over either a coaxial cable using RCA or BNC connectors, or a fibre-optic cable using TOSLINK connectors. S/PDIF interconnects components in home theaters and other digital high-fidelity systems.

S/PDIF is based on the AES3 interconnect standard. S/PDIF can carry two channels of uncompressed PCM audio or compressed 5.1 surround sound; it cannot support lossless surround formats that require greater bandwidth.

S/PDIF is a data link layer protocol as well as a set of physical layer specifications for carrying digital audio signals over either optical or electrical cable. The name stands for Sony/Philips Digital Interconnect Format, but is also known as Sony/Philips Digital Interface. Sony and Philips were the primary designers of S/PDIF. S/PDIF is standardized in IEC 60958 as IEC 60958 type II (IEC 958 before 1998).

== Applications ==
A common use is to carry two channels of uncompressed digital audio from a CD player to an amplifying receiver.

The S/PDIF interface is also used to carry compressed digital audio for surround sound as defined by the IEC 61937 standard. This mode is used to connect the output of a Blu-ray, DVD player or computer, via optical or coax, to a home theatre amplifying receiver that supports Dolby Digital or DTS Digital Surround decoding.

== Hardware specifications ==
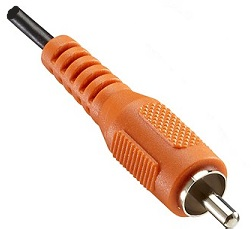
Digital audio coaxial RCA connector (orange)

S/PDIF was developed at the same time as the main standard, AES3, used to interconnect professional audio equipment in the professional audio field. This resulted from the desire of the various stakeholders to have at least sufficient similarities between the two interfaces to allow the use of the same, or very similar, designs for interfacing ICs. S/PDIF is nearly identical at the protocol level, (Note: Consumer S/PDIF supports the Serial Copy Management System, whereas professional interfaces do not.) but uses either coaxial cable (with RCA connectors) or optical fibre (TOSLINK; i.e., JIS F05 or EIAJ optical), both of which cost less than the XLR connection used by AES3. The RCA connectors are typically colour-coded orange to differentiate from other RCA connector uses, such as composite video. S/PDIF uses 75 Ω coaxial cable while AES3 uses 110 Ω balanced twisted pair.

Signals transmitted over consumer-grade TOSLINK connections are identical in content to those transmitted over coaxial connectors. Optical provides electrical isolation that can help address ground loop issues in systems. The electrical connection can be more robust and supports longer connections.

Comparison of AES3 and S/PDIF
	AES3		S/PDIF	
	Balanced	Unbalanced	Copper	Optical
Cabling	110 Ω STP	75 Ω coaxial	75 Ω coaxial	Optical fibre
Connector	3-pin XLR	BNC	RCA or BNC	TOSLINK
Output level	2–7 V peak to peak	1.0–1.2 V peak to peak	0.5–0.6 V peak to peak	—N/a
Min. input level	0.2 V	0.32 V	0.2 V	—N/a
Max. distance	1000 m	100 m	10 m	
Modulation	Biphase mark code			
Subcode information	ASCII id. text		SCMS copy protection info.	
Audio bit depth	24 bits		20 bits (24 bits, optionally)	

== Protocol specifications ==
S/PDIF is used to transmit digital signals in a number of formats, the most common being the 48 kHz sample rate format (used in Digital Audio Tape and DVDs) and the 44.1 kHz format, used in CD audio. In order to support both sample rates, as well as others that might be needed, the format has no defined bit rate. Instead, the data is sent using biphase mark code, which has either one or two transitions for every bit, allowing the original word clock to be extracted from the signal itself.

IEC 60958-3 defines the consumer interface primarily for stereophonic programmes with up to 20 bits per sample; use of the auxiliary sample bits permits an extension to 24 bits per sample. Its Mode 0 channel-status format includes a 192 kHz sampling-frequency indication. Thus, a single consumer-interface link can carry two-channel 24-bit/192 kHz linear PCM where both endpoints and the physical link support that mode.

Although later channel-status extensions assign values above 192 kHz, the standard states that sampling frequencies above 192 kHz are not actual audio sampling frequencies; they indicate frame rates for high-bit-rate transmission using the IEC 60958 protocol.

S/PDIF protocol differs from AES3 only in the channel status bits; see AES3 § Protocol for the high-level view. Both protocols group 192 samples into an audio block, and transmit one channel status bit per sample, providing one 192-bit channel status word per channel per audio block. For S/PDIF, the 192-bit status word is identical between the two channels and is divided into 12 words of 16 bits each, with the first 16 bits being a control code.

S/PDIF control word components
Byte	Bit	Unset (0)	Set (1)
0	0	Consumer (S/PDIF)	Professional (AES3) (changes meaning to AES3 channel status word)
0	1	Normal PCM	Compressed data
0	2	Copy restrict	Copy permit
0	3	2 channels	4 channels
0	4	—	—
0	5	No pre-emphasis	Pre-emphasis 50/15
0	6–7	Mode, defines subsequent bytes; values other than zero are undefined.	
1	0–6	Audio source category indicating the type of source equipment (general, CD-DA, DVD, etc.)	
1	7	L-bit, original or copy (Note: (for most category codes) indicates whether copy-restricted audio is original (may be copied once) or a copy (does not allow recording again). The L-bit is only used if bit 2 is zero, meaning copy-restricted audio. The L-bit polarity depends on the category, with recording allowed if it is 1 for DVD-R and DVD-RW, but 0 for CD-R, CD-RW, and DVD. For plain CD-DA (ordinary nonrecordable CDs), the L-bit is not defined, and recording is prevented by alternating bit 2 at a rate of 4–10 Hz.)	
2	0–3	Source number	
2	4–7	Channel number	
3	0–3	Sampling frequency: 00002: 44.1 kHz, 01002: 48 kHz, 11002: 32 kHz	
3	4–5	Clock accuracy: 102: 50ppm,002: 1100ppm, 012: variable pitch (requires compatible receiver)	
3	6–7	Undefined	
4	0	Word length 20 bits	Word length 24 bits
4	1–3	Sample length (0: undefined, 1–4: word length minus 1-4 bits, 5: full word length)	
4	4–7	Undefined	
5–10	0-7	EAN-13 code (possibly in binary-coded decimal)	
11	0-3	EAN-13 code (possibly in binary-coded decimal)	
11	4–7	Undefined; padding on 13-digit EAN code	
12–13	0-7	Undefined	
14	0–3	Undefined	
14	4-7	ISRC (encoding unclear; ISRC is 2 alphabetic, 3 alphanumeric and 7 numeric, which is 26^{2} × 36^{3} × 10^{7} ≈ 2^{48.164} and so obviously fits into 7.5 bytes, but a naive 5 ASCII + 7 BCD would be 8.5 bytes)	
15–21	0–7	ISRC (encoding unclear; ISRC is 2 alphabetic, 3 alphanumeric and 7 numeric, which is 26^{2} × 36^{3} × 10^{7} ≈ 2^{48.164} and so obviously fits into 7.5 bytes, but a naive 5 ASCII + 7 BCD would be 8.5 bytes)	
22–23	0–7	Undefined	

=== Data framing ===
S/PDIF block contains 192 frames, and each frame contains two sub-frames. A sub-frame has either 20- or 24-bit audio data.

S/PDIF is meant to be used for transmitting 20-bit audio data streams plus other related information. S/PDIF can also transport 24-bit samples by way of four extra bits; however, not all equipment supports this, and these extra bits may be ignored.

To transmit sources with less than 20 bits of sample accuracy, the superfluous bits will be set to zero, and the 4:1–3 bits (sample length) are set accordingly.

==== IEC 61937 encapsulation ====
IEC 61937 defines a way to transmit compressed, multi-channel data over S/PDIF.

- The control word bit 0:1 is set to indicate the presence of non-linear-PCM data.
- The sample rate is set to maintain the needed symbol (data) rate. The symbol rate is usually 64 times the sample rate.
- Data is packed into blocks. Each data block is given an IEC 61937 preamble, containing two 16-bit sync words and indicating the state and identity (type, validity, bitstream number, length) of encapsulated data present. Padding is added to match the full block size as required by timing.

A number of encodings are available over IEC 61937, including Dolby AC-3/E-AC-3, MP3, AAC, ATRAC, DTS, and WMA Pro.

S/PDIF does not support HDCP.

== Limitations ==
The receiver does not control the data rate, so it must avoid bit slip by synchronizing its reception with the source clock. Many S/PDIF implementations cannot fully decouple the final signal from the influence of the source or the interconnect. Specifically, the process of clock recovery used to synchronize reception may produce jitter. If the DAC does not have a stable clock reference, then noise will be introduced into the resulting analog signal. However, receivers can implement various strategies that limit this influence.

== See also ==
- ADAT Lightpipe
- I^{2}S
- McASP
