= Audio Engineering Society =

Organization of professional audio engineers

Audio Engineering Society, Inc.
- Formation: 1948; 78 years ago
- Headquarters: New York City
- Members: Over 12,000
- Website: aes.org

The Audio Engineering Society (AES) is a professional body for engineers, scientists, and other individuals with an interest or involvement in the professional audio industry. The membership largely comprises engineers developing devices or products for audio, and persons working in audio content production. It also includes acousticians, audiologists, academics, and those in other disciplines related to audio. The AES is the only worldwide professional society devoted exclusively to audio technology.

Established in 1948, the Society develops, reviews and publishes engineering standards for the audio and related media industries, and produces the AES Conventions, which are held twice a year alternating between Europe and the US. The AES and individual regional or national sections also hold AES Conferences on different topics during the year.

== History ==
The idea of a society dedicated solely to audio engineering had been discussed for some time before the first meeting, but was first proposed in print in a letter by Frank E. Sherry, of Victoria, Texas, in the December 1947 issue of the magazine Audio Engineering. A New York engineer and audio consultant, C.J. LeBel, then published a letter agreeing, and saying that a group of audio professionals had already been discussing such a thing, and that they were interested in holding an organizational meeting. He asked interested persons to contact him for details. The response was enthusiastic and encouraging. Fellow engineer Norman C. Pickering published the date for an organizational meeting and announced the appointment of LeBel as acting chairman, and himself as acting secretary.

The organizational meeting was held at the RCA Victor Studios in New York City on February 17, 1948. Acting chairman LeBel spoke first, emphasizing the professional, non-commercial, independent nature of the proposed organization. Acting Secretary Norman Pickering then discussed the need for a professional organization that could foster an exchange of knowledge in this quickly-growing field. The group agreed to form the Audio Engineering Society, and confirmed the acting executive committee, which consisted of John D. Colvin, C. J. LeBel, C. G. McProud, Norman C. Pickering and Chester O. Rackey.

The first AES technical membership meeting followed on March 11, with about 3500 attendees. The guest speaker at the first meeting was Harry F. Olson, a prominent engineer and scientist at RCA and author of Acoustical Engineering, who spoke on Problems of High-Fidelity Reproduction.

== Membership ==
As of 2020 AES has over 12,000 members. Members elect a Board of Governors and officers, who jointly set policies and procedures for the Society. The AES is a tax-exempt, 501(c)(3) non-profit corporation headquartered in New York.

== Journal ==
The AES publishes a peer-reviewed journal, the Journal of the Audio Engineering Society (JAES).

== Conventions and conferences ==
The AES produces two conventions each year as well as a number of topic-specific conferences. The fall convention is in North America and the spring convention is in Europe. The first convention was in 1949.

== Technical Council ==
23 Technical Committees advise the AES Technical Council on emerging trends and areas of interest in the audio engineering community. The Committee meetings, held at Conventions, are open to participation by members and non-members alike, and are the venue for planning workshops, seminars and conferences in specific technical areas.

== Standards ==
The AES has been involved in setting technical standards for audio since 1977. The AES Standards Committee (AESSC), through a consensus system open to anyone materially affected by such standards, develops and publishes a number of standards on the subject of analog and digital audio recording, transmission, and/or reproduction. Notable standards include:

- AES3 (also commonly known as AES/EBU) for digital audio interconnection
- AES10 (also commonly known as MADI) for multichannel digital audio interconnection
- AES11 for digital audio synchronization
- AES31 file exchange format
- AES42 for digitally interfaced microphones
- AES47, AES51 and AES53 for sending AES3 digital audio data over Asynchronous Transfer Mode networks
- AES48 on interconnections; grounding and EMC practices; and shields of connectors in audio equipment containing active circuitry
- AES64 for coarse-groove mechanical audio recordings
- AES67 for audio over IP interoperability

AESSC also provides input to IEC for development and revision of international standards in audio engineering.

AES does not charge for participation in the standards process, but does charge non-members for online copies of published standards. Printed copies are available for a charge to both members and non-members.

== Gold Medal recipients ==
The AES Gold Medal is the Society's highest honor, and is given in recognition of outstanding achievements, sustained over a period of years, in the field of Audio Engineering. The award was established in 1971; it was formerly known as the John H. Potts Memorial Award.

=== Awardees in chronological order ===
- Harry F. Olson (1949)
- Howard A. Chinn (1950)
- Hermon Hosmer Scott (1951)
- Frank L. Capps (1952)
- Edward W. Kellogg (1953)
- J.P. Maxfield (1954)
- Lee De Forest (1955)
- Sherman Fairchild (1955)
- O.B. Hanson (1956)
- Edward C. Wente (1957)
- Samuel B. Snow (1957)
- Harvey Fletcher (1958)
- Harold Stephen Black (1959)
- Semi Joseph Begun (1960)
- John Kenneth Hilliard (1961)
- Arthur C. Davis (1962)
- Benjamin B. Bauer (1963)
- Vern Oliver Knudsen (1964)
- Frederick Vinton Hunt (1965)
- John E. Volkmann (1966)
- Arnold P.G. Peterson (1968)
- William B. Snow (1968)
- Marvin Camras (1969)
- Rudy Bozak (1970)
- Leo Beranek (1971)
- Manfred R. Schroeder (1972)
- Henry E. Roys (1973)
- Floyd K. Harvey (1974)
- Georg Neumann (1976)
- John G. Frayne (1976)
- Daniel R. von Recklinghausen (1978)
- Hugh S. Knowles (1978)
- Arthur C. Keller (1981)
- Duane H. Cooper (1982)
- Willi Studer (1982)
- Cyril M. Harris (1984)
- Stefan Kudelski (1984)
- Claude E. Shannon (1985)
- Thomas Stockham (1987)
- Heitaro Nakajima (1989)
- Eberhard Zwicker (1991)
- Michael Gerzon (1991)
- Ray M. Dolby (1992)
- Bart N. Locanthi (1996)
- Richard H. Small (1996)
- Kees A. Schouhamer Immink (1999)
- Fritz Sennheiser (2002)
- Gerhard Steinke (2007)
- Jens Blauert (2008)
- George Massenburg (2008)
- Rupert Neve (2011)
- Phil Ramone (2011)
- Rudy Van Gelder (2013)
- Floyd Toole (2014)
- Bob Ludwig (2015)
- Diana Deutsch (2016)
- D. B. Keele Jr. (2016)
- Malcolm Omar Hawksford (2017)
- Tony Agnello (2021)
- Jamie Angus-Whiteoak (2023)
- Richard Factor (2021)

== British section ==
The AES British Section, which was the first and is also the largest outside the US, issues a monthly newsletter and holds regular lectures, usually in London, with occasional visits to studios and other places of interest. Lectures, which are often on topics of topical interest to audio enthusiasts, are usually recorded, with past lectures available to all as free MP3 downloads, sometimes with accompanying slides in PDF format.

== Connection with the VDT ==
Although there are several German sections of the AES and there is no formal connection to the Verband Deutscher Tonmeister, the goals and activities of both organizations are closely related and there are several instances of double memberships, e.g. in the persons of Benjamin Bernfeld, Gerhard Steinke and Günther Theile.

== See also ==
- Acoustical Society of America
- Institute of Acoustics, Chinese Academy of Sciences
- Institute of Acoustics (United Kingdom)
- Institute of Electrical and Electronics Engineers
- Institute of Radio Engineers
- Royal Academy of Engineering
- Society of Broadcast Engineers
- Society of Motion Picture and Television Engineers
