= Audio and video interfaces and connectors =

Electrical or optical connectors for carrying audio and video signals

Audio connectors and video connectors are electrical or optical connectors for carrying audio or video signals. Audio interfaces or video interfaces define physical parameters and interpretation of signals. Some connectors and interfaces carry either audio only or video only, whereas others carry both, audio and video.

For digital audio and digital video, this can be thought of as defining the physical layer, data link layer, and most or all of the application layer. For analog audio and analog video, these functions are all represented in a single signal specification like NTSC or the direct speaker-driving signal of analog audio.

Physical characteristics of the electrical or optical equipment include the types and numbers of wires required, voltages, frequencies, optical intensity, and the physical design of the connectors. Any data link layer details define how application data is encapsulated (for example, for synchronization or error-correction). Application layer details define the actual audio or video format being transmitted, often incorporating codecs not specific to the interface, such as PCM, MPEG-2, or the DTS Coherent Acoustics codec. In some cases, the application layer is left open; for example, HDMI contains an Ethernet channel for general data transmission.

Some types of connectors are used by multiple hardware interfaces; for example, RCA connectors are used both by the composite video and component video interfaces, but DVI is the only interface that uses the DVI connector. This means that in some cases not all components with physically compatible connectors will actually work together.

Analog A/V connectors often use shielded cables to inhibit radio frequency interference (RFI) and noise.

== Interfaces and their connectors ==
Interface			Connectors
Audio or video	Digital or analog	Description	Connectors
Audio only	Analog	Often unmarked on consumer audio equipment since it is so common, or labelled with a headphones symbol or as "line out". Computers and other equipment sometimes use Microsoft-Intel color coding scheme, especially when there are multiple input/output plugs.	3.5 mm TRS minijack RCA connector
Audio only	Analog	Balanced audio	6.35 mm TRS audio jack (shielded twisted pair), XLR (shielded twisted pair)
Audio only	Digital	S/PDIF (Sony/Philips Digital Interconnect Format). Via coaxial or optical cables.	RCA jack (coaxial), TOSLINK (optical), BNC (rare)
Audio only	Digital	AES3 (also known as AES/EBU)	RCA jack (coaxial), XLR (shielded twisted pair), TOSLINK (optical), BNC
Audio only	Digital	MADI	BNC (coaxial), ST (optical)
Video only	Analog	Video Graphics Array (VGA)	D-subminiature 15-pin
Video only	Analog	Composite. Often designated by the CVBS acronym, meaning "Color, Video, Blank and Sync".	RCA jack, normally yellow (often accompanied by red and white for right and left audio channels, respectively)
Video only	Analog	S-Video (Separate Video). Carries standard definition video and does not carry audio on the same cable.	Mini-DIN 4-pin
Video only	Analog	Component. In popular use, it refers to a type of analog video information that is transmitted or stored as three separate signals. Either RGB interfaces or YPbPr	3 RCA jacks
Video only	Analog	Composite, S-Video, and Component	VIVO = Mini-DIN 9-pin with breakout cable.
Video only	Digital and analog	Digital Visual Interface (DVI)	DVI connector
Video and audio	Analog	SCART (Peritel)	SCART
Video and audio	Digital	High-Definition Multimedia Interface (HDMI), BNC	HDMI connector
Video and audio	Digital	DisplayPort	DisplayPort connector
Video and audio	Digital	HDBaseT	8P8C connector
Video and audio	Digital	IEEE 1394 "FireWire"	FireWire or i.LINK connectors

== Multiple signals ==
Several generic digital data connection standards are designed to carry audio/video data along with other data and power:

- USB was designed as a single connector to support all needs, including any generic data, audio/video, power, and more; DisplayLink is its most successful Audio+Video protocol. Until the 3.0 revision, very low data rates meant most A/V needed alternative connectors.
- USB-C can directly transport USB 3.1, DisplayPort, Thunderbolt, HDMI, and MHL protocols, with power, audio and many other protocols possible.
- Thunderbolt is the successor to FireWire, a generic high-speed data link with well-defined audio/video uses. The latest Thunderbolt 3 uses USB-C as its connector, though not all USB-C is Thunderbolt-compatible.
- FireWire is a generic data link with audio/video standards used on Camcorders (particularly MiniDV) and high-end studio audio and video equipment.
- DisplayPort carries digital audio and video, as well as auxiliary information, along with its Mini DisplayPort cousin.
- 30-pin dock connector, a docking cradle for Apple iPod, iPhone and iPad, and its Lightning successor
- Apple Display Connector (ADC), now-defunct Apple Display Connector
- Ethernet using modular connectors supports audio over Ethernet, audio over IP, IPTV and other digital multimedia formats.

Some digital connection standards were designed from the beginning to primarily carry audio and video signals simultaneously:

- HDMI combines DVI-compliant uncompressed video data with compressed or uncompressed audio, and supports other protocols.
- Mobile High-Definition Link (MHL)

Many analog connectors carry both:

- F connectors, also known as RF connectors, were the standard analog connector of the analog era in the Americas, used primarily with coaxial cable (RG-59 and RG-6), and have been repurposed for generic digital data connections.
- SCART was the standard connector of the analog era in Europe.
- S-Video was an improvement over the F connector.
- Tip-ring connector with 4 conductors.

=== S/PDIF ===
S/PDIF is an audio-only format carried over electrical coaxial cable (with RCA jacks) or optical fibre (TOSLINK).

Note that there are no differences in the signals transmitted over optical or coaxial S/PDIF connectors—both carry exactly the same information. Selection of one over the other rests mainly on the availability of appropriate connectors on the chosen equipment and the preference and convenience of the user. Connections longer than 6 meters or so, or those requiring tight bends, should use coaxial cable, since the high light signal attenuation of TOSLINK cables limits their effective range.

=== HDMI ===
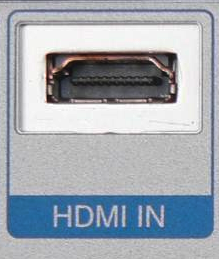
HDMI Type A socket

High-Definition Multimedia Interface (HDMI) is a compact audio/video standard for transmitting uncompressed digital data.

There are three HDMI connector types. Type A and Type B were defined by the HDMI 1.0 specification. Type C was defined by the HDMI 1.3 specification. Type A is electrically compatible with single-link DVI-D. Type B is electrically compatible with dual link DVI-D but has not yet been used in any products.

=== IEEE 1394 "FireWire" ===
The 6-circuit and 4-circuit alpha FireWire 400 connectors

IEEE 1394 (branded "FireWire") is a digital data transfer protocol commonly used for digital cameras (common on MiniDV tape camcorders), but also used for computer data and audio data transfers.

Unlike Point-to-Point connections listed above, IEEE 1394 is able to host several signals on the same wire, with the data delivered and shown on the destination set. It is also fully bidirectional, with its full bandwidth used in one direction or the other, or split between directions up to its maximum.

=== DisplayPort ===
External connector (source-side) on PCB

DisplayPort is a digital display interface standard (approved May 2006, current version 1.4 published on March 1, 2016). It defines a new license-free, royalty-free, digital audio/video interconnect, intended to be used primarily between a computer and its display monitor, or a computer and a home-theater system.

The video signal is not compatible with DVI or HDMI, but a DisplayPort connector can pass these signals through. DisplayPort is a competitor to the HDMI connector, the de facto digital connection for high-definition consumer electronics devices.

== Audio connectors ==
Audio connectors are used for audio frequencies. They can be analog or digital.

Single-wire connectors used frequently for analog audio include:

- Banana connectors
- Spade connectors
- Five-way binding posts and banana plugs for loudspeakers
- Fahnestock clips on early breadboard radio receivers.
- Euroblock "European-style terminal block" or "Phoenix connectors", screw terminal connectors used for audio and control signals

Multi-conductor connectors:

- DB25 is for multi-track recording and other multi-channel audio, analog or digital
- DIN connectors and mini-DIN connectors
- Euroblock "European-style terminal block" or "Phoenix connectors", screw terminal connectors used for audio and control signals
- RCA connectors, also known as phono connectors or phono plugs, used for analog or digital audio or analog video
- Speakon connectors by Neutrik for loudspeakers
- Phone connector also known as tip-ring-sleeve (TRS) or tip-sleeve plug, phone plug, jack plug, mini-jack, and mini-stereo. This includes the original 6.35mm (quarter inch) jack and the more recent and standard 3.5mm (miniature or 1/8 inch) and 2.5mm (subminiature) jacks, both mono and stereo (balanced) versions.
- XLR connectors, also known as Cannon plugs, used for analog or digital balanced audio with a balanced line.

Digital audio interfaces and interconnects:

- ADAT interface (DB25)
- AES/EBU interface, normally with XLR connector
- S/PDIF, either over electrical coaxial cable (with RCA jacks) or optical fiber (TOSLINK).

=== Phone connector ===
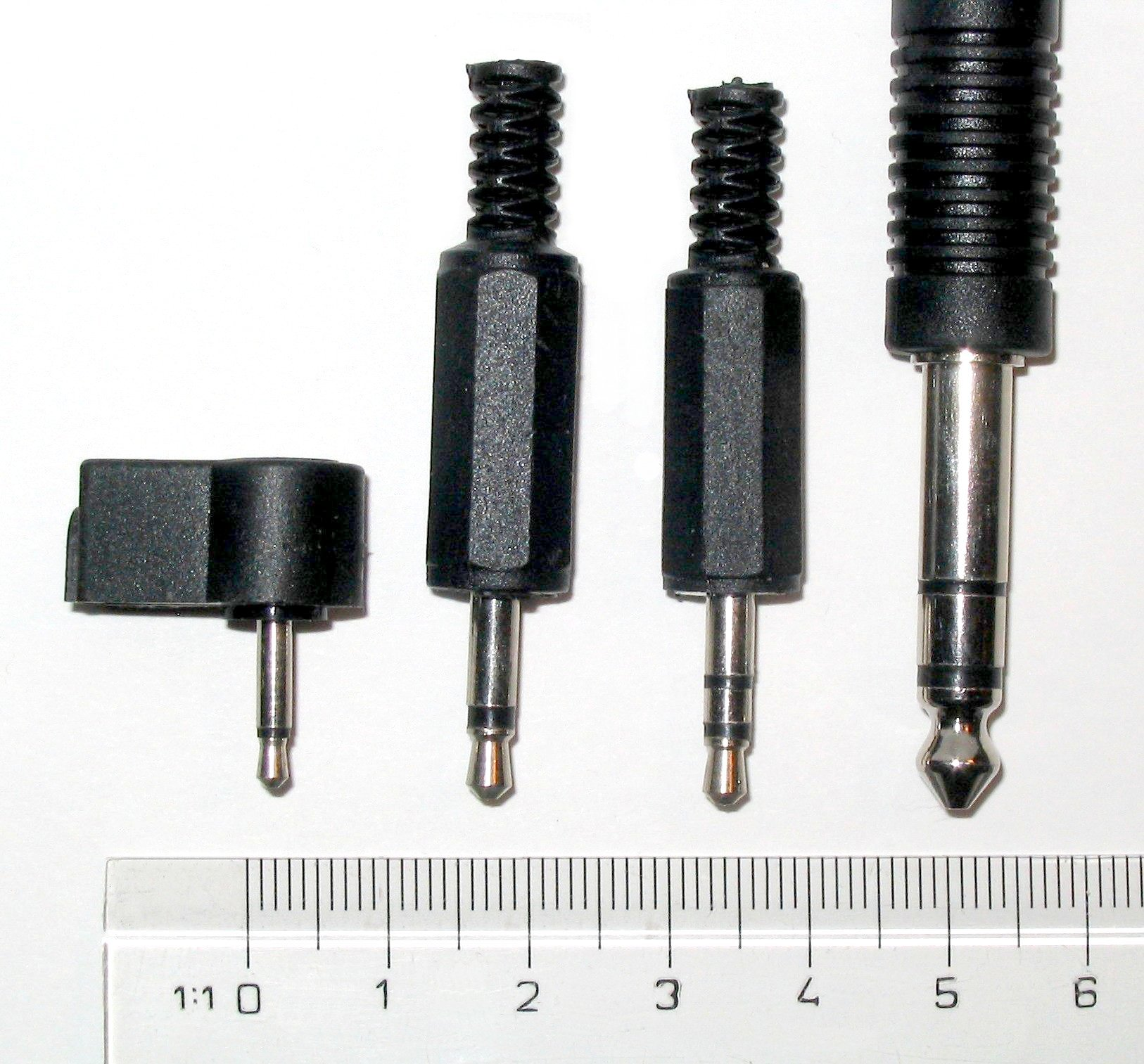
2.5 mm (3/32") mono (TS), 3.5 mm (1/8") mono and stereo (TRS), and 6.3 mm (1/4") stereo (TRS) phone connectors

A phone connector (tip, ring, sleeve) is also called an audio jack, phone plug, jack plug, stereo plug, mini-jack, or mini-stereo. This includes the original 6.35 mm (quarter inch) jack and the more recent 3.5 mm (miniature or 1/8 inch) and 2.5 mm (subminiature) jacks, both mono and stereo versions. There also exists 4.4 mm Pentaconn connectors.

=== DIN ===
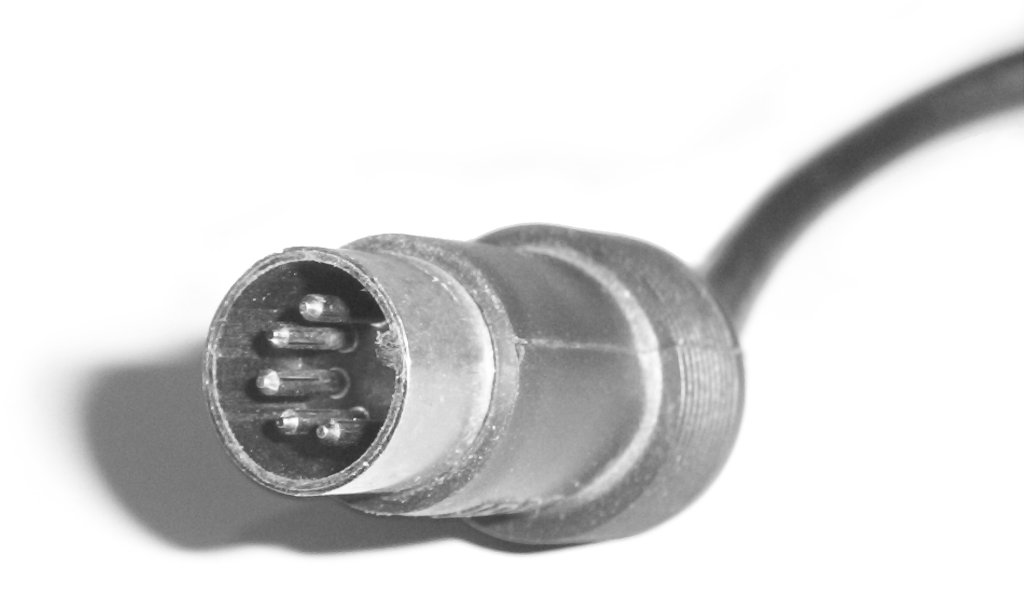
Five-pin male 180° DIN connector

A DIN connector is a connector that was originally standardized by the Deutsches Institut für Normung (DIN). Mini-DIN is a variation.

=== BNC ===
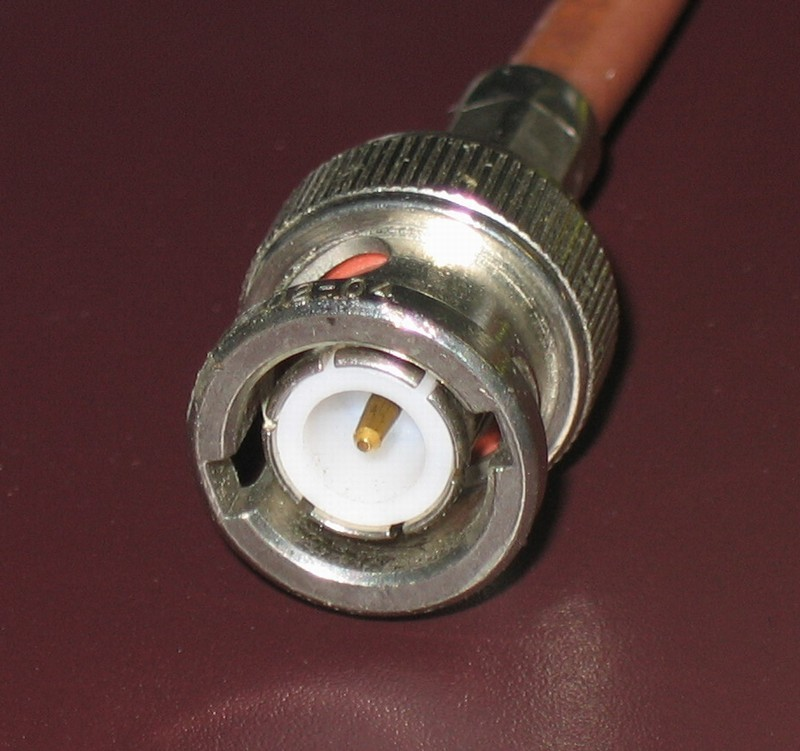
Male 50 ohm BNC connector

The BNC connector is a very common type of RF connector used for terminating coaxial cable.

=== TOSLINK ===
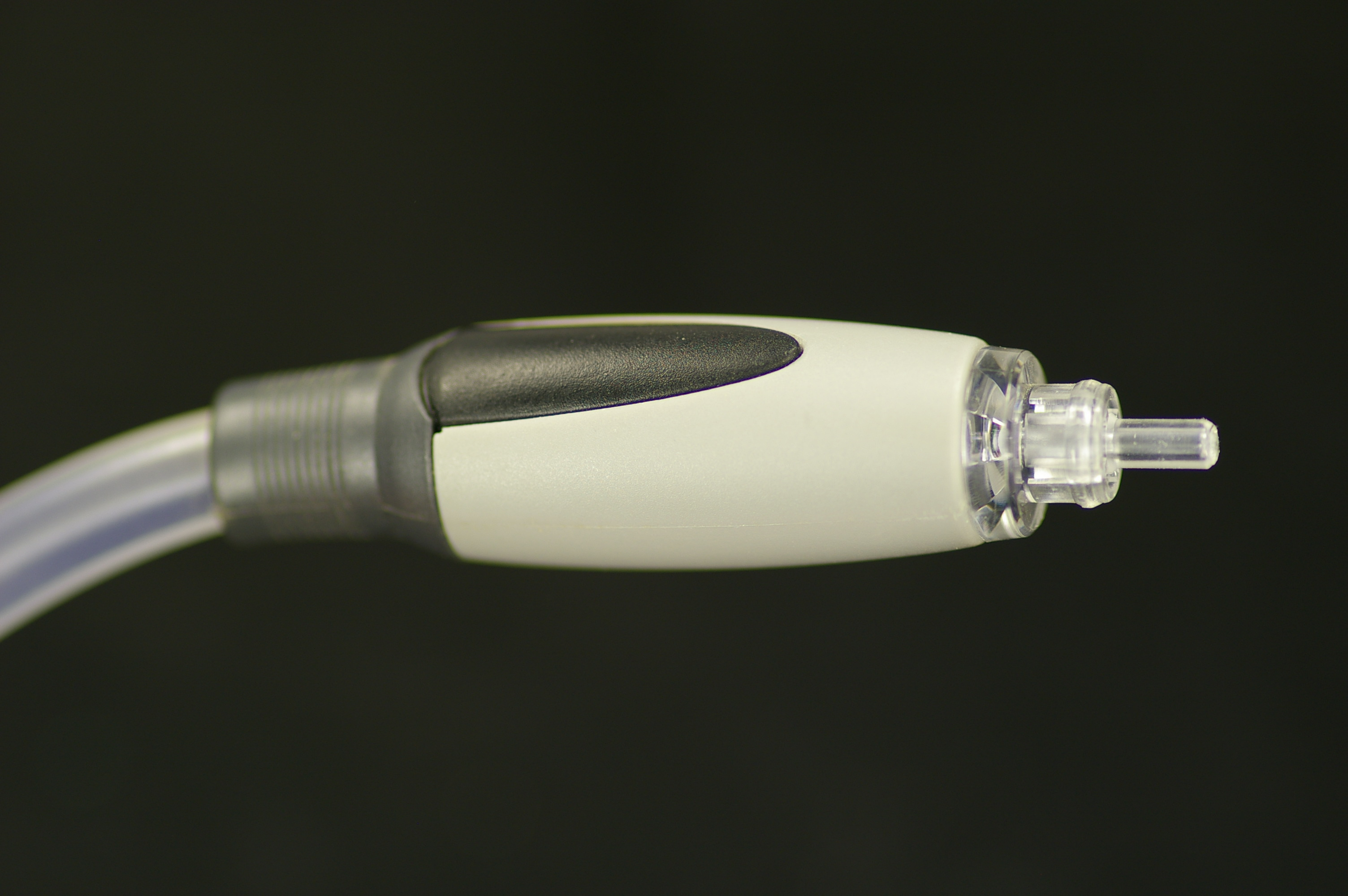
Clear TOSLINK cable with a round connector

TOSLINK is a standardized optical fiber connection system.

=== XLR ===
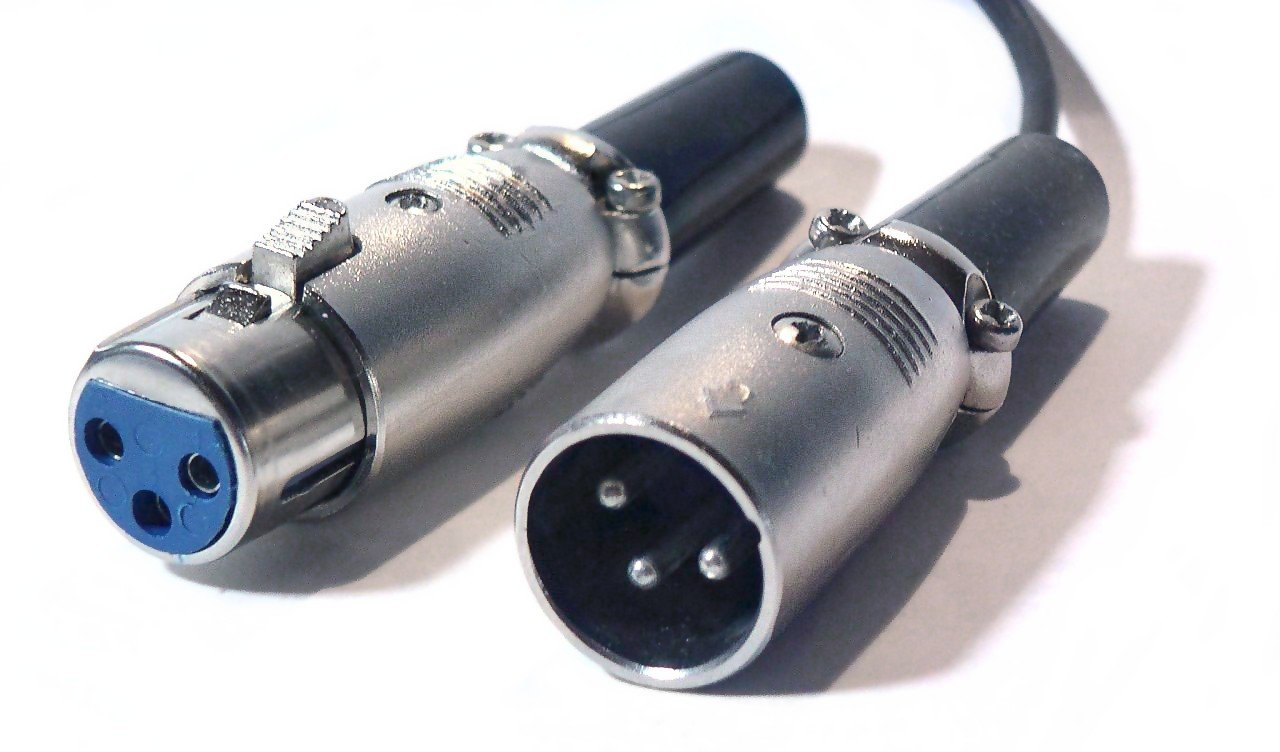
XLR3 cable connectors, female on left and male on right

XLR connector plugs and sockets are used mostly in professional audio and video electronics cabling applications. XLR connectors are also known as Cannon plugs after their original manufacturer. They are used for analog or digital balanced audio with a balanced line

Digital audio interfaces and interconnects with the AES/EBU interface also normally use an XLR connector.

=== RCA ===
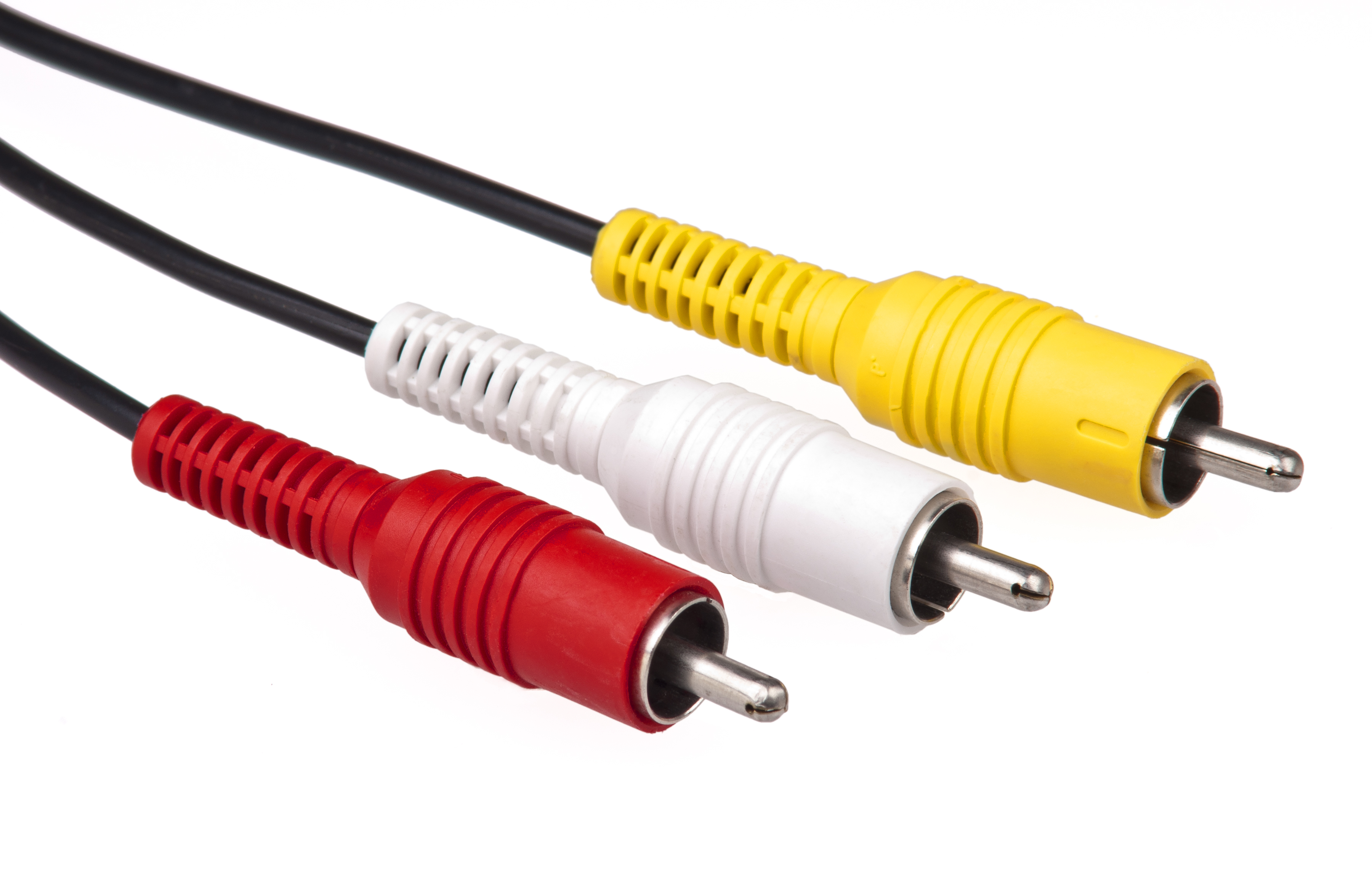
RCA Plugs for composite video (yellow) and stereo audio (white and red)

RCA connectors, also known as phono connectors or phono plugs, are used for analog or digital audio or analog video. These were first used inside pre–World War II radio-phonographs to connect the turntable pickup to the radio chassis. They were not intended to be disconnected and reconnected frequently, and their retaining friction was quite sufficient for their original purpose. Furthermore, the design of both cable and chassis connectors was for minimum cost. Initially intended for audio-frequency connections only, the RCA plug was also used for analog composite video and non-critical radio-frequency applications.

== Video connectors ==
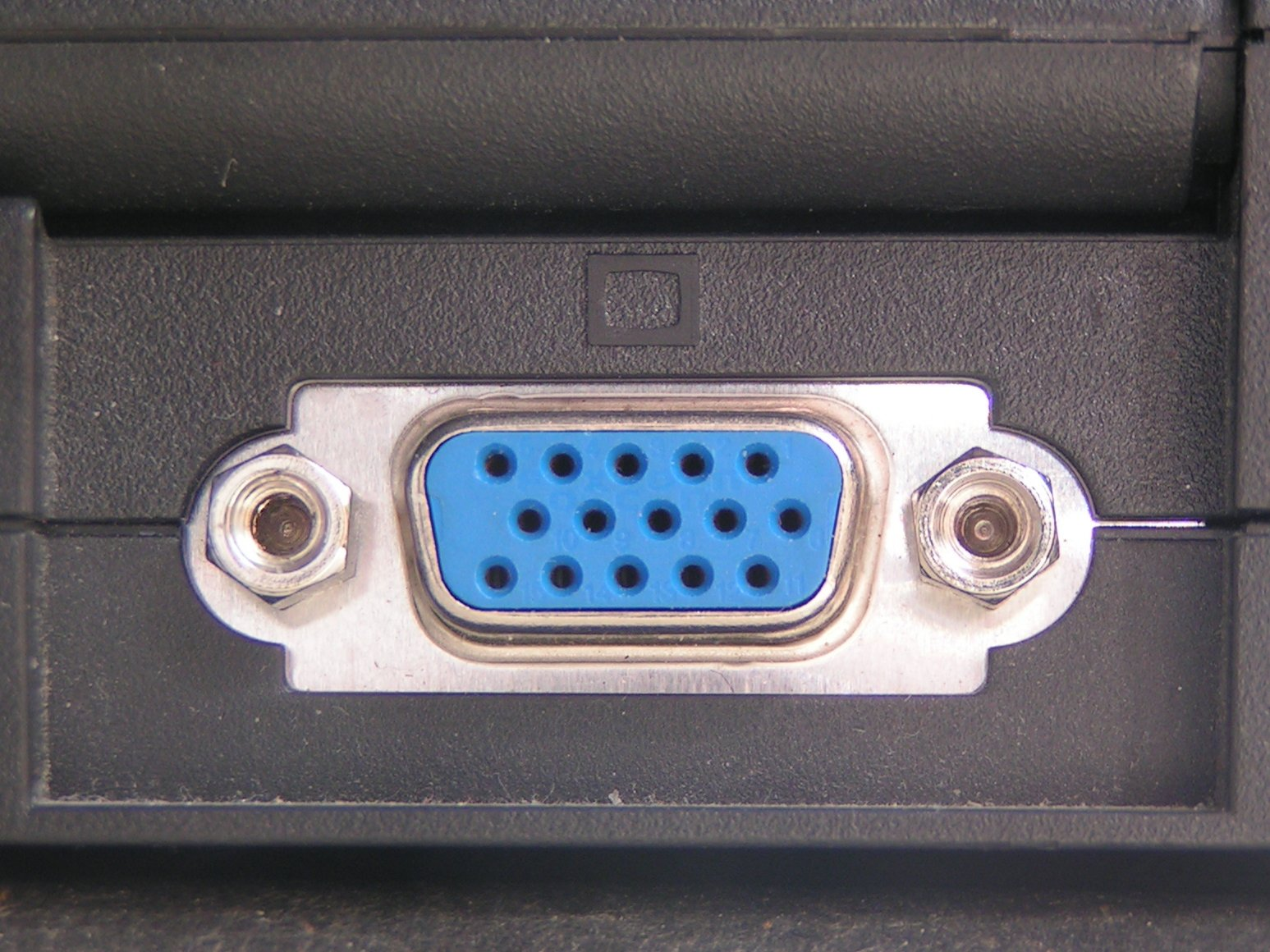
A VGA connector

Video connectors carry only video signals. Common video-only connectors include:

- Component video a.k.a. YPbPr (3 RCA or BNC; or D-Terminal)
- Composite video (1 RCA, Antenna socket, or BNC)
- DB13W3 ("13W3" computer video connector)
- DMS-59, single connector carrying two DVI and two VGA
- Musa, British connector used in broadcasting and telecommunications
- PAL connector, common in Europe as an antenna connector
- S-Video (1 Mini-DIN)
- SDI - Broadcast grade digital interface over BNC cables
- VGA connector A type of D-sub connector standard on most video cards
- Mini-VGA Found on some laptop computers
- 5 BNC Connectors can also be used to carry the VGA signal as R, G, B, HSync, VSync
- Digital Visual Interface (DVI) A hybrid analog/digital connector commonly found on PC graphics cards and LCD monitors
- Mini-DVI Found on some Apple laptops
- Enhanced Graphics Adapter (EGA)
- RGB interface
- RGBI interface
- VESA Digital Flat Panel

=== Mini-DIN ===
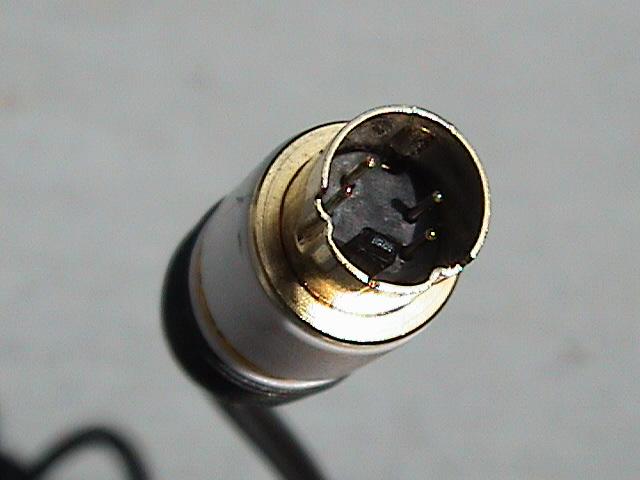
mini-DIN 4 pin for S-Video

The Mini-DIN connectors are a family of multi-pin electrical connectors used in a variety of applications. Mini-DIN is similar to the larger, older DIN connector. Both are standards of the Deutsches Institut für Normung, the German standards body.

=== D-subminiature ===
DA, DB, DC, DD, and DE sized connectors

D-subminiature or D-sub is a common type of electrical connector used particularly in computers. Calling them "sub-miniature" was appropriate when they were first introduced, but today they are among the largest common connectors used in computers. The DB25 is used for multi-track recording and other multi-channel audio, analog or digital (ADAT interface (DB25)), and was the standard connector for IBM-compatible PC printer connection before USB and other connections became popular. It offered 8 simultaneous data pathways to the printer.

=== Video In Video Out ===
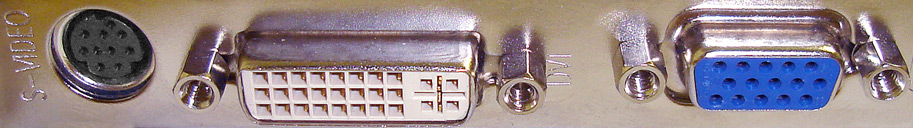
A graphics card with VIVO, DVI and VGA outputs

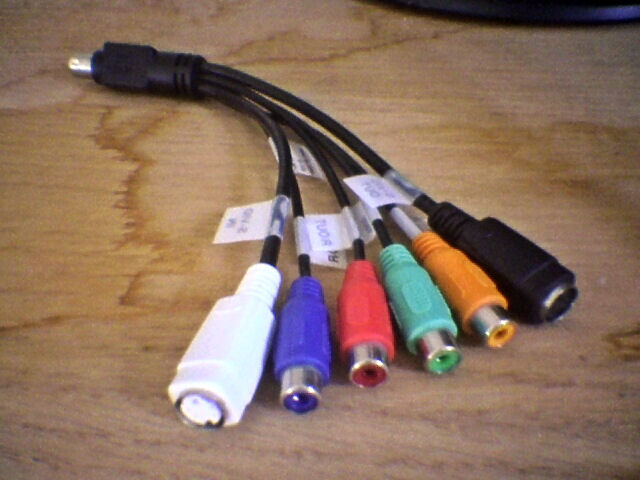
A 6-connector VIVO splitter cable. From left to right: S-Video In, Component P_{b} out, Component P_{r} out, Component Y out/Composite out, Composite in, S-Video Out

Video In Video Out, usually seen as the acronym VIVO (commonly pronounced vee-voh), is a graphics card port which enables some video cards to have bidirectional (input and output) video transfer through a Mini-DIN, usually of the 9-pin variety, and a specialised splitter cable (which can sometimes also transfer sound).

VIVO is found predominantly on high-end ATI video cards, although a few high-end NVIDIA video cards also have this port. VIVO on these graphics cards typically supports Composite, S-Video, and Component as outputs, and composite and S-Video as inputs. Many other video cards only support component and/or S-Video outputs to complement Video Graphics Array or DVI, typically using a component breakout cable and an S-Video cable.

=== DVI Connector ===
Male DVI connector pins (view of plug)

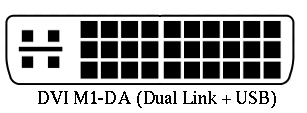
Male M1-DA connector pins (view of plug)

The Digital Visual Interface (DVI) is a video interface standard designed to maximize the visual quality of digital display devices such as flat panel LCD computer displays and digital projectors. It is designed for carrying uncompressed digital video data to a display.

There are four basic connectors:

- DVI-D (digital only)
- DVI-A (analog only)
- DVI-I (integrated, digital & analog)
- M1-DA (integrated, digital, analog & USB)

The connector also includes provision for a second data link for high-resolution displays, though many devices do not implement this. In those that do, the connector is sometimes referred to as DVI-DL (dual link).

So we need to know two things about the connector:

1. Whether it carries analog, digital, or both; and
2. For connectors that carry digital links, whether it is single- or dual-link, and whether it carries USB

== Color codes ==
=== Audio ===
white RCA/TS	analogue audio, left channel; also mono (RCA/TS), stereo (TRS only), or undefined/other
black RCA/TS/TRS	analogue audio, left channel; also mono (RCA/TS), stereo (TRS only), or undefined/other
grey RCA/TS/TRS	analogue audio, left channel; also mono (RCA/TS), stereo (TRS only), or undefined/other
red RCA/TS	analogue audio, right channel
orange RCA	S/PDIF digital audio

For computers:

green TRS 3.5 mm	stereo output, front channels
black TRS 3.5 mm	stereo output, rear channels
grey TRS 3.5 mm	stereo output, side channels
gold TRS 3.5 mm	dual output, center and subwoofer
blue TRS 3.5 mm	stereo input, line level
pink TRS† 3.5 mm	mono microphone input

† Although the mic input is usually mono, the input is still a TRS phone socket. Many mono 'computer' mics are fitted with TRS plugs. The tip is for the MIC and the ring is for power (to power an electret-condenser style MIC).

There are exceptions to the above:

- Hosa cables use grey and orange for left and right analogue channels.
- RadioShack cables sometimes use grey and black for left and right.
- Older sound cards had non-standard colour codes until after PC 99, prior to that, all plugs on a card were typically the same color.

==== PC System Design Guide audio ====
Older sound cards had no common standard color codes until after PC 99. The PC System Design Guide (also known as the PC 97, PC 98, PC 99, or PC 2001 specification) is a series of hardware design requirements and recommendations for IBM PC compatible personal computers, compiled by Microsoft and Intel Corporation during 1997–2001. PC 99 introduced a color code for the various standard types of plugs and connectors used on PCs.

The color codes for audio plugs follow:

Pink / 701C	Analog microphone audio input (†mono or stereo).
Light blue / 284C	Analog line level audio input.
Lime green / 577C	Analog line level audio output.
Orange / 157C	Analog audio output for the center speaker and Subwoofer
Brown / 4645C	Analog audio output for "right-to-left" speakers.
Gold / 131C	MIDI/game

† Though the input is often mono, the actual connector is usually still a 3-conductor TRS phone minijack. Many mono computer microphones have 3-conductor TRS plugs.

=== Video ===
yellow RCA/BNC	composite video
red RCA/BNC	red or Pr/Cr chrominance
green RCA/BNC	green or luminance
blue RCA/BNC	blue or Pb/Cb chrominance
white BNC	horizontal sync
black BNC	vertical sync

Newer connectors are identified by their shape and not their colour.

== Storage ==
For efficiency and simplicity, the same codec or signal convention is used by the storage medium. For example, VHS tapes can store a magnetic representation of an NTSC signal, and the specification for Blu-ray Discs incorporates PCM, MPEG-2, and DTS. Some playback devices can re-encode audio or video so that the format used for storage does not have to be the same as the format transmitted over the A/V interface (which is helpful if a projector or monitor cannot handle a newer codec).

== See also ==
- Audio interface
- Category:Telecommunications standards
- Computer port (hardware)
- Speaker wire
- Speakon connectors
- Video interface
- Y-cable
