= Computer display technology =

Computer display technology encompasses:

- Computer monitor hardware technologies, such as CRT and LCD
- Audio and video interfaces and connectors
