= Computer port (hardware) =

Computerized hardware

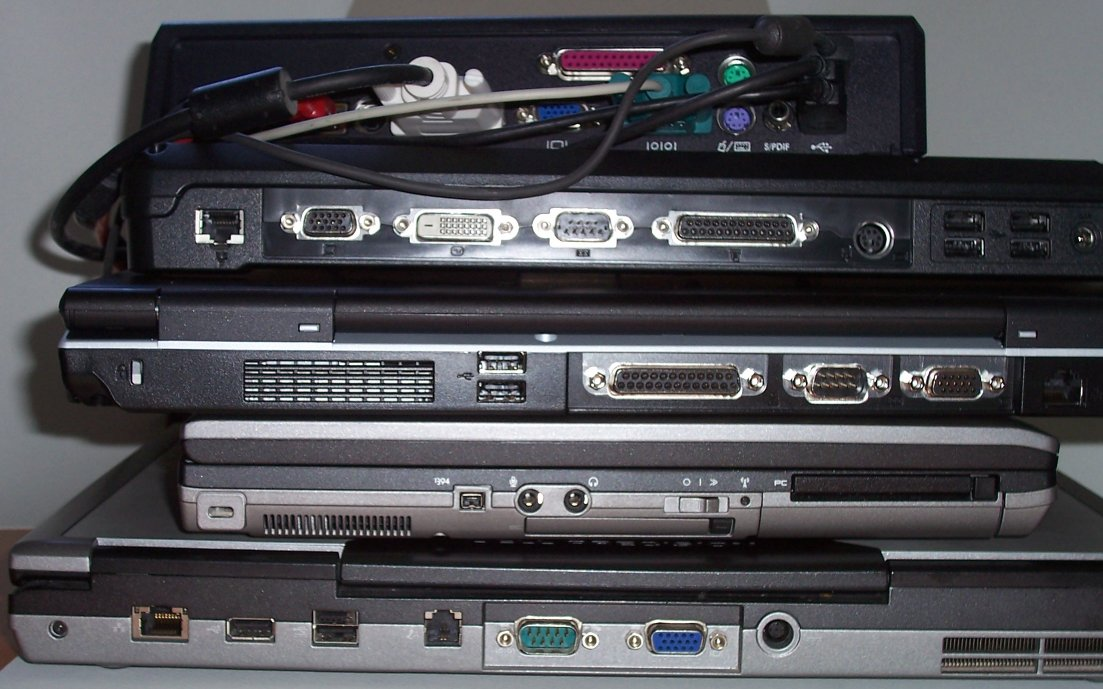
Examples of computer connector sockets on various laptops

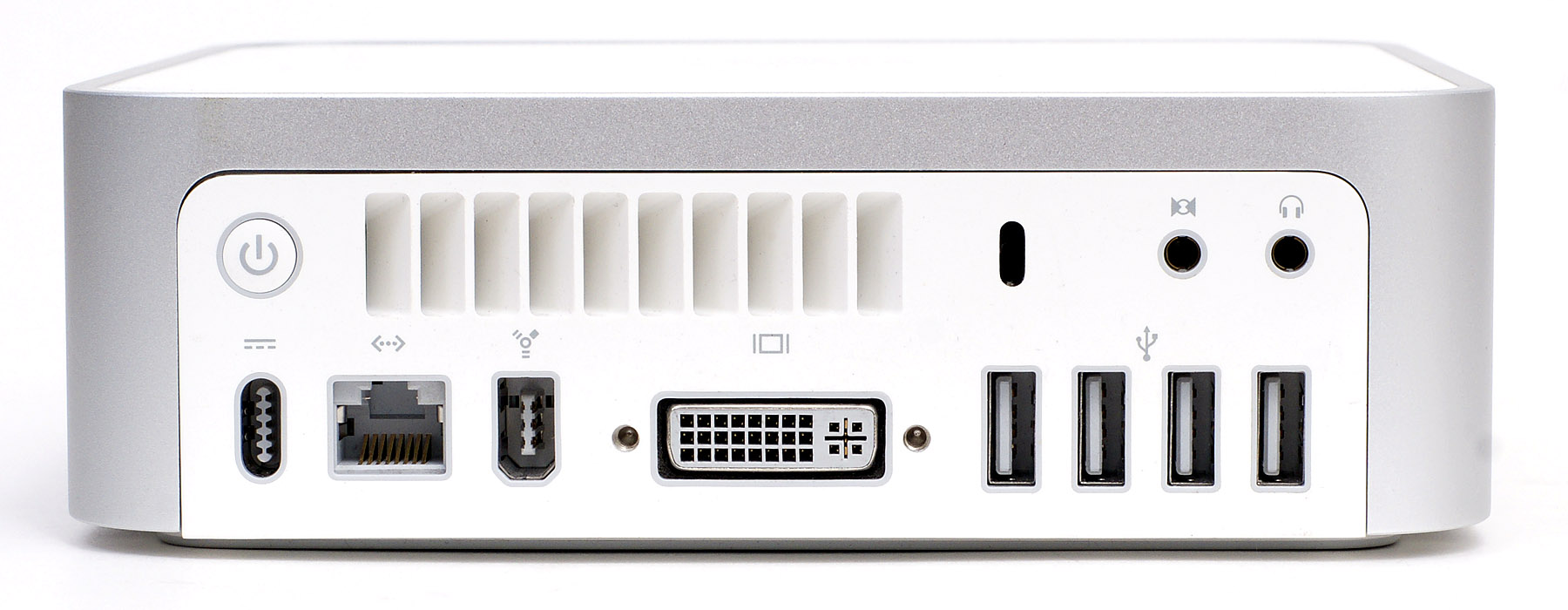
Ports on the back of the Apple Mac Mini (2005)

A computer port is a hardware piece on a computer where an electrical connector can be plugged to link the device to external devices, such as another computer, a peripheral device or network equipment. This is a non-standard term.

Electronically, the several conductors where the port and cable contacts connect, provide a method to transfer data signals between devices.

Bent pins are easier to replace on a cable than on a connector attached to a computer, so it was common to use female connectors for the fixed side of an interface.

Computer ports in common use cover a wide variety of shapes such as round (PS/2, etc.), rectangular (FireWire, etc.), square (Telephone plug), trapezoidal (D-Sub — the old printer port was a DB-25), etc. There is some standardization to physical properties and function. For instance, most computers have a keyboard port (currently a Universal Serial Bus USB-like outlet referred to as USB Port), into which the keyboard is connected.

Physically identical connectors may be used for widely different standards, especially on older personal computer systems, or systems not generally designed according to the current Microsoft Windows compatibility guides. For example, a 9-pin D-subminiature connector on the original IBM PC could have been used for monochrome video, color analog video (in two incompatible standards), a joystick interface, or a MIDI musical instrument digital control interface. The original IBM PC also had two identical 5 pin DIN connectors, one used for the keyboard, the second for a cassette recorder interface; the two were not interchangeable. The smaller mini-DIN connector has been variously used for the keyboard and two different kinds of mouse; older Macintosh family computers used the mini-DIN for a serial port or for a keyboard connector with different standards than the IBM-descended systems.

== Electrical signal transfer ==
Electronically, hardware ports can almost always be divided into two groups based on the signal transfer:

- Analog ports
- Digital ports:
  - Parallel ports send multiple bits at the same time over several sets of wires.
  - Serial ports send and receive one bit at a time via a single wire pair (Ground and +/-).

After ports are connected, they typically require handshaking, where transfer type, transfer rate, and other necessary information is shared before data is sent.

Hot-swappable ports can be connected while equipment is running. Almost all ports on personal computers are hot-swappable.

Plug-and-play ports are designed so that the connected devices automatically start handshaking as soon as the hot-swapping is done. USB ports and FireWire ports are plug-and-play.

Auto-detect or auto-detection ports are usually plug-and-play, but they offer another type of convenience. An auto-detect port may automatically determine what kind of device has been attached, but it also determines what purpose the port itself should have. For example, some sound cards allow plugging in several different types of audio speakers; then a dialogue box pops up on the computer screen asking whether the speaker is left, right, front, or rear for surround sound installations. The user's response determines the purpose of the port, which is physically a 1/8" tip-ring-sleeve mini jack. Some auto-detect ports can even switch between input and output based on context.

As of 2006, manufacturers have nearly standardized colors associated with ports on personal computers, although there are no guarantees. The following is a short list:

- Orange, purple, or grey: Keyboard PS/2
- Green: Mouse PS/2
- Blue or magenta: Parallel printer DB-25
- Amber: Serial DB-25 or DB-9
- Pastel pink: Microphone 1/8" stereo (TRS) minijack
- Pastel green: Speaker 1/8" stereo (TRS) minijack

Additionally, USB ports are color-coded according to the specification and data transfer speed, e.g. USB 1.x and 2.x ports are usually white or black, and USB 3.0 ones are blue. SuperSpeed+ connectors are teal in color.

FireWire ports used with video equipment (among other devices) can be either 4-pin or 6-pin. The two extra conductors in the 6-pin connection carry electrical power. This is why a self-powered device such as a camcorder often connects with a cable that is 4-pins on the camera side and 6-pins on the computer side, the two power conductors simply being ignored. This is also why laptop computers usually have only 4-pin FireWire ports, as they cannot provide enough power to meet requirements for devices needing the power provided by 6-pin connections.

Optical (light) fiber, microwave, and other technologies (i.e., quantum) have different kinds of connections, as metal wires are not effective for signal transfers with these technologies. Optical connections are usually a polished glass or plastic interface, possibly with an oil that lessens refraction between the two interface surfaces. Microwaves are conducted through a pipe, which can be seen on a large scale by examining microwave towers with "funnels" on them leading to pipes.

Hardware port trunking (HPT) is a technology that allows multiple hardware ports to be combined into a single group, effectively creating a single connection with a higher Bandwidth sometimes referred to as a double-barrel approach. This technology also provides a higher degree of fault tolerance because a failure on one port may just mean a slow-down rather than a dropout. By contrast, in software port trunking (SPT), two agents (websites, channels, etc.) are bonded into one with the same effectiveness; i.e., ISDN B1 (64K) plus B2 (64K) equals data throughput of 128K.

The USB-C standard, published in 2014, supersedes previous connectors and is reversible (although not electrically), meaning it can be plugged both ways. Reversible plugs have a symmetric pinout. Other reversible connectors include Apple's Lightning.

== Types of ports ==
=== Digital Visual Interface ===
Digital Visual Interface

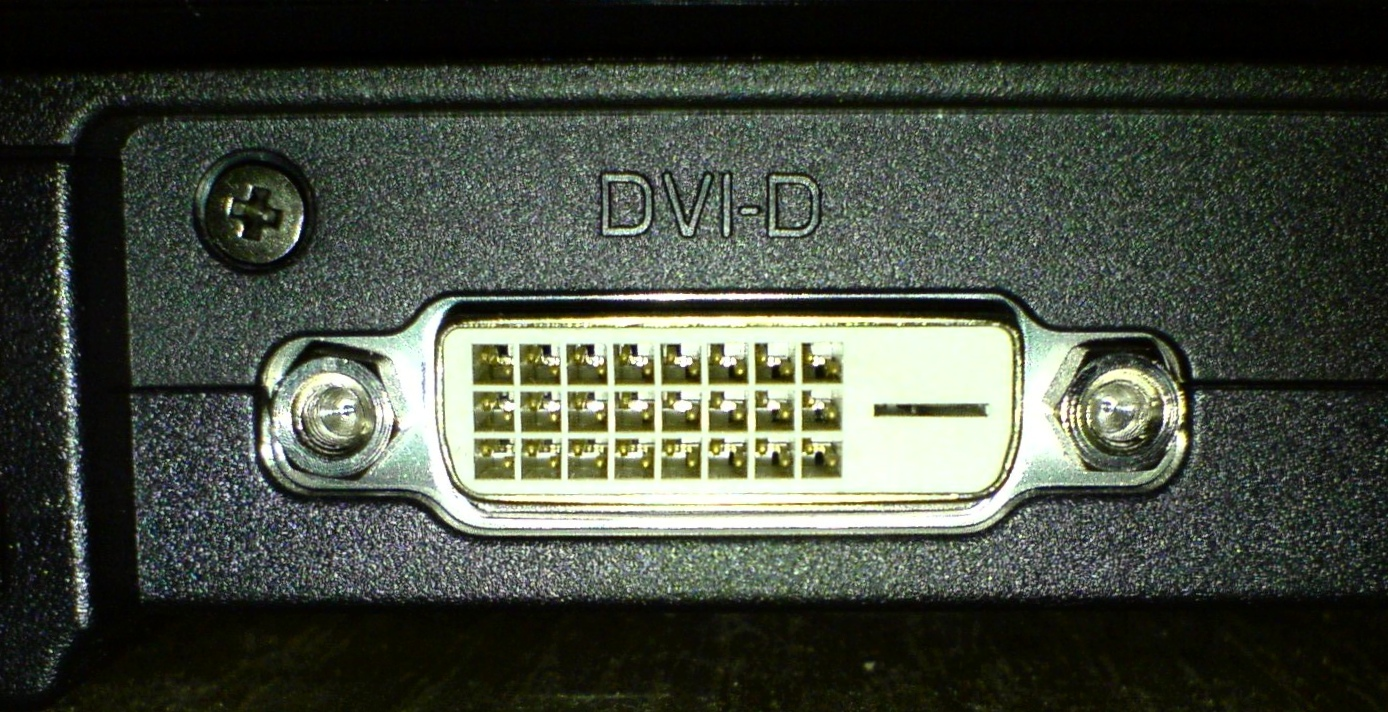
DVI port

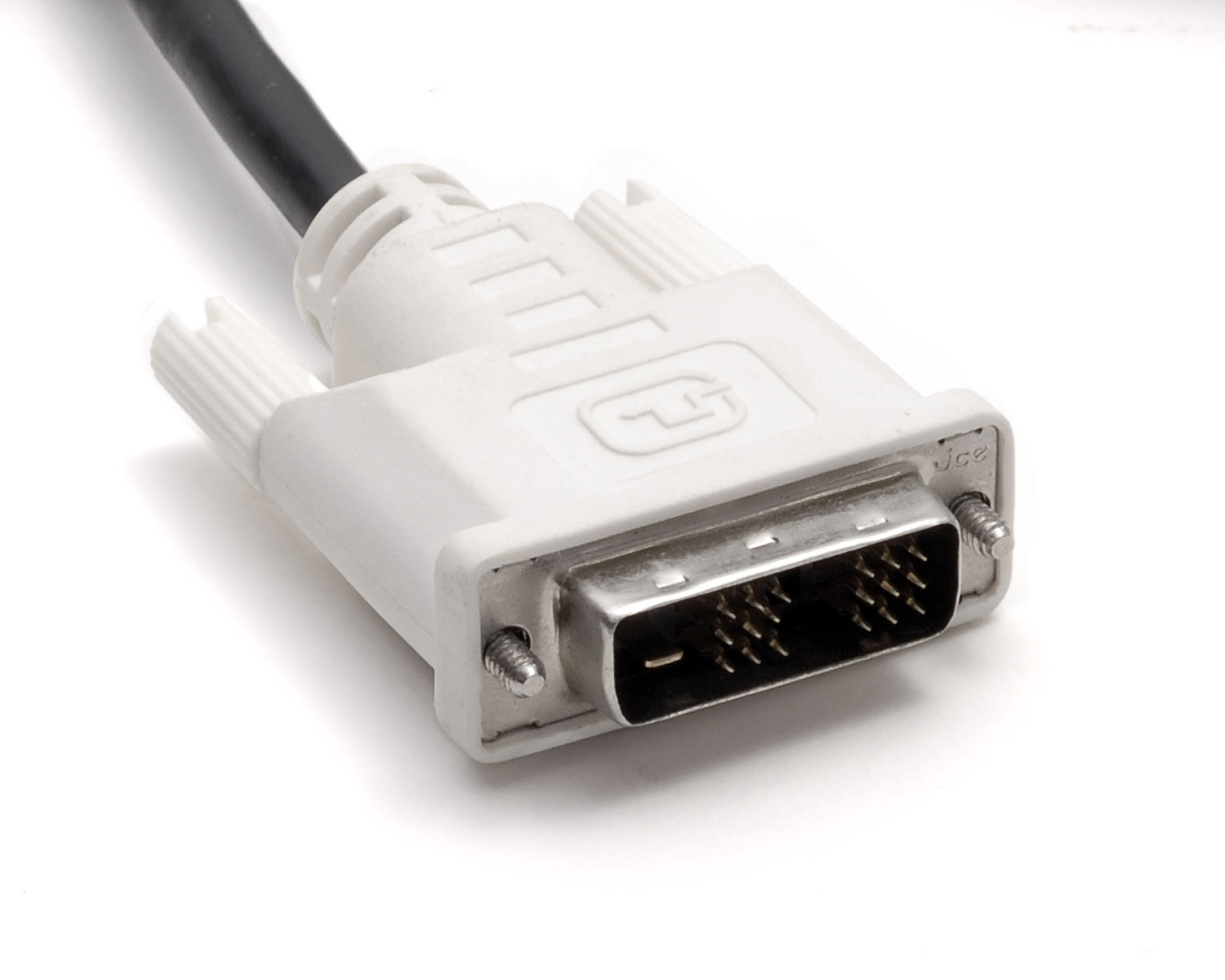
Cable

DVI

=== DisplayPort ===
DisplayPort

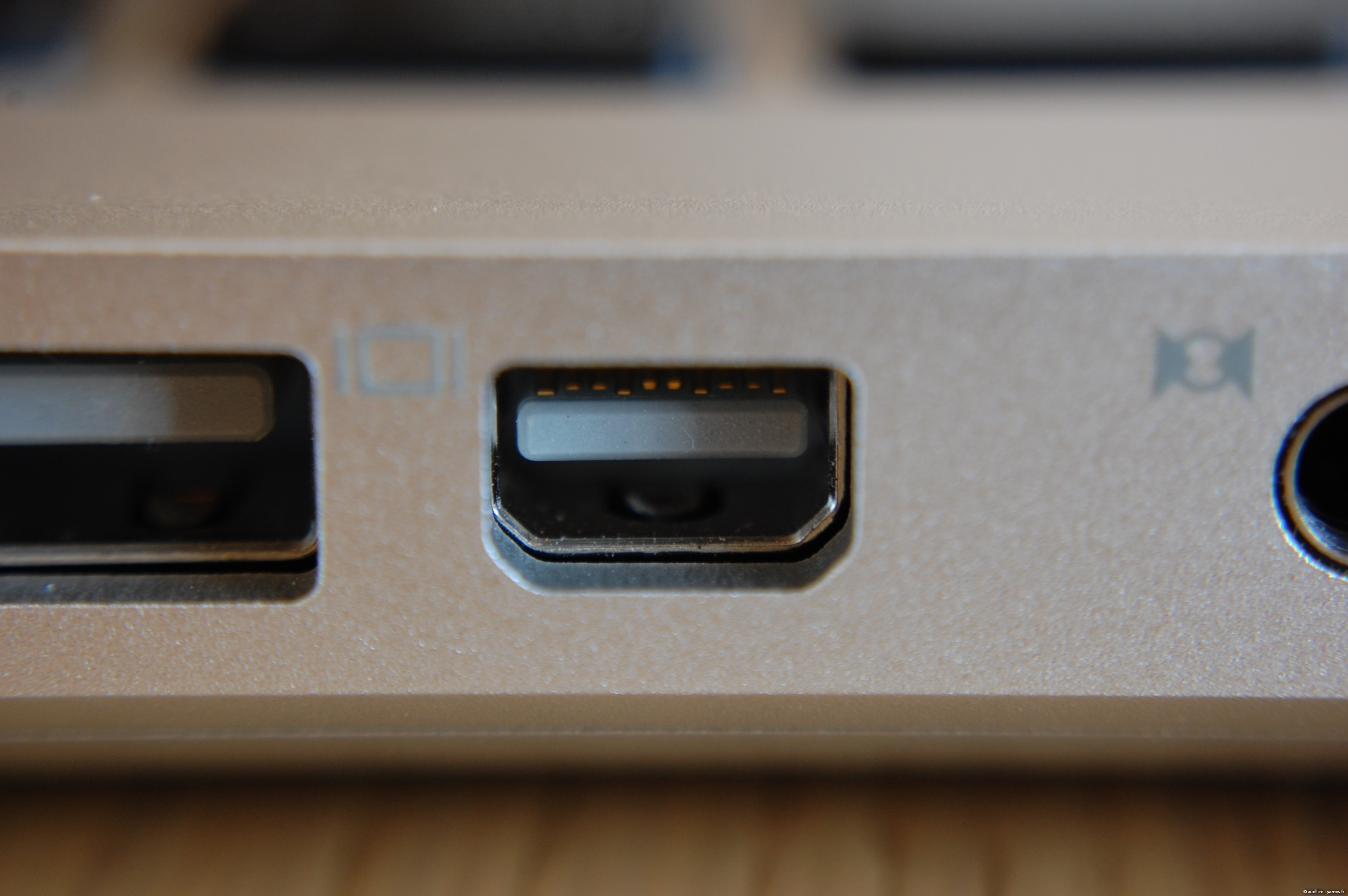
Mini DisplayPort

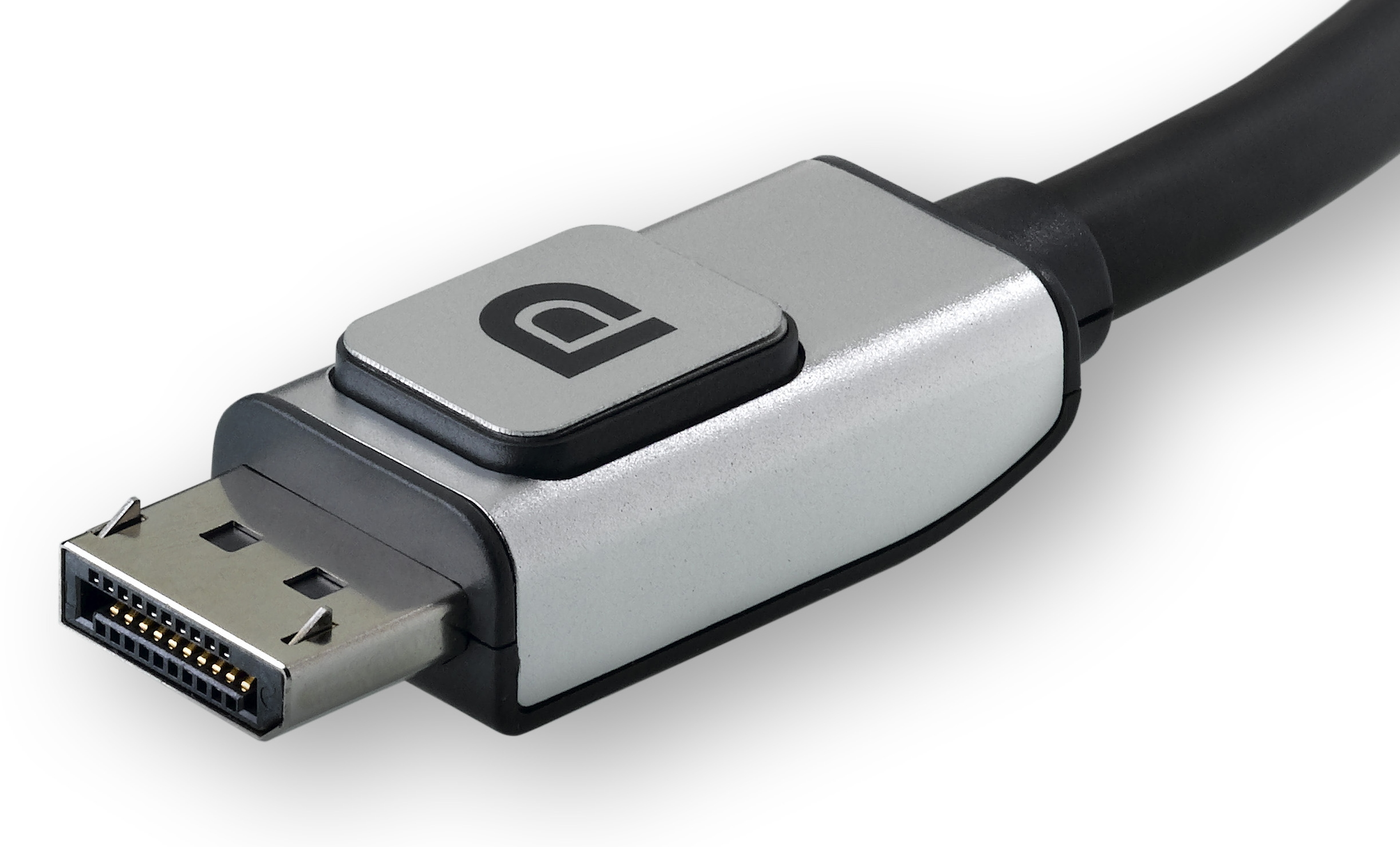
DisplayPort cable

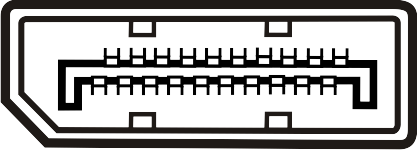
DisplayPort

=== eSATA ===
ESata

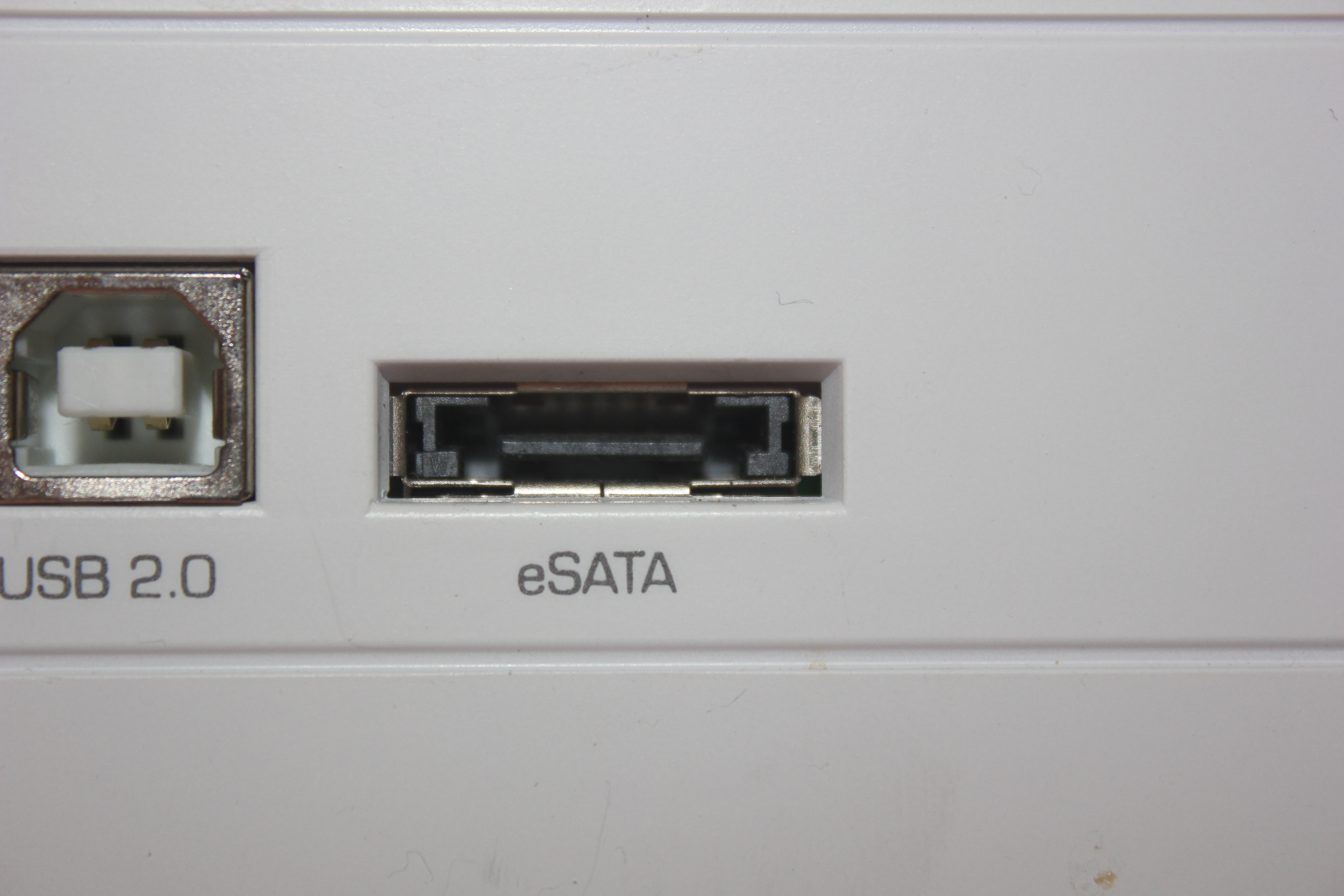
Shown on a hard-drive dock

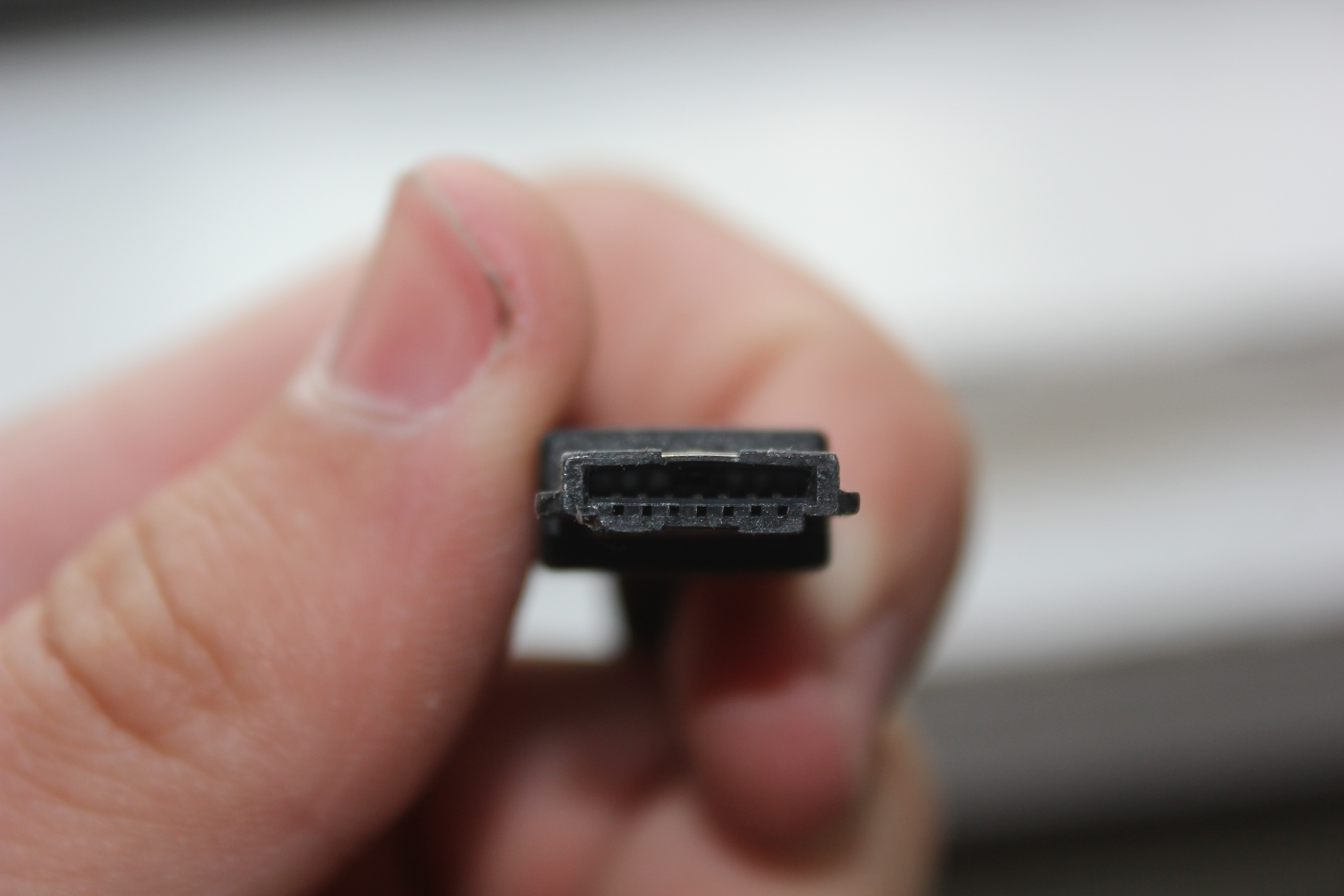
Cable

=== HDMI ===
HDMI

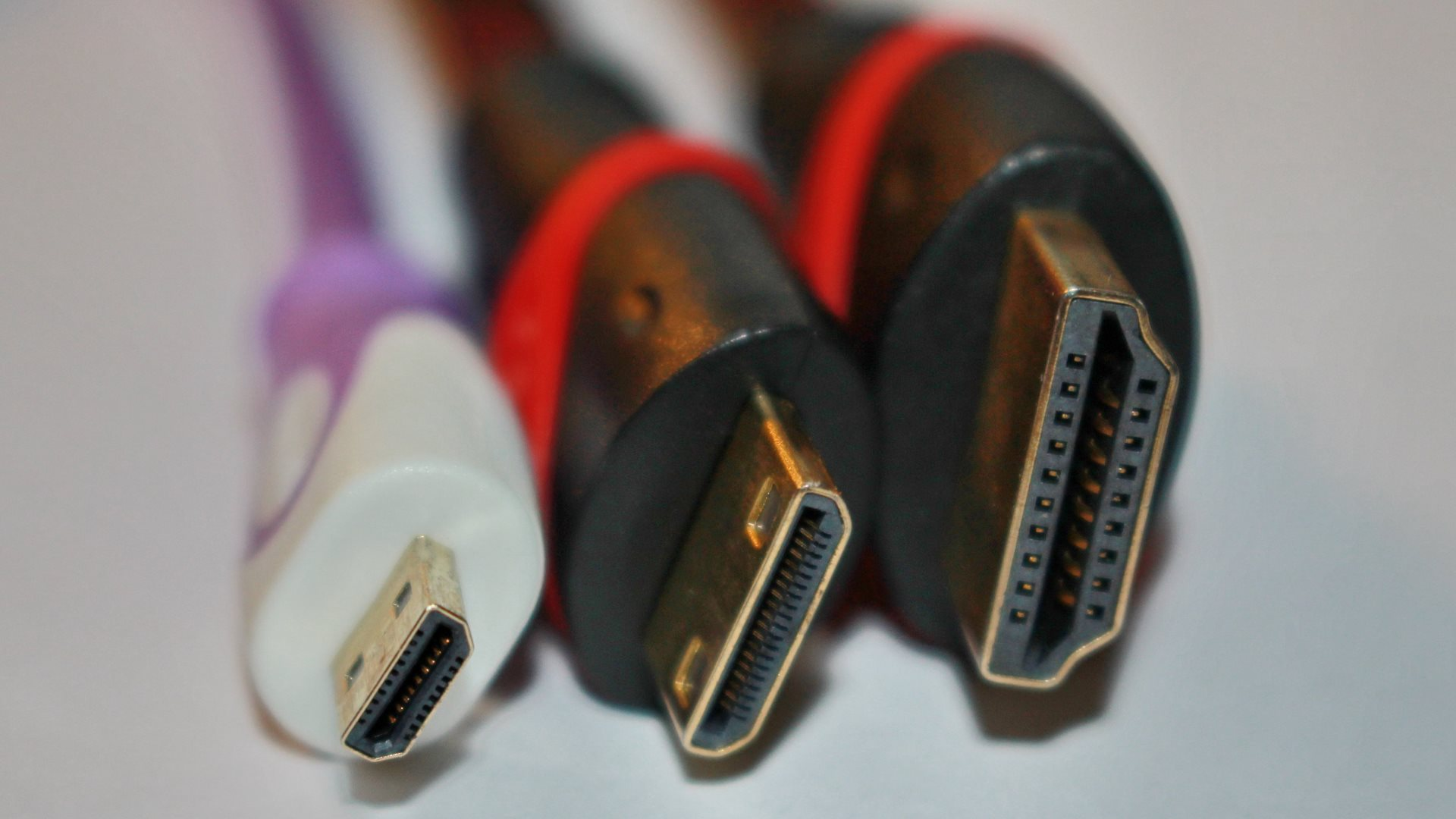
HDMI, Mini-HDMI, and Micro HDMI Cables

HDMI

=== PS/2 ===
PS/2 connector

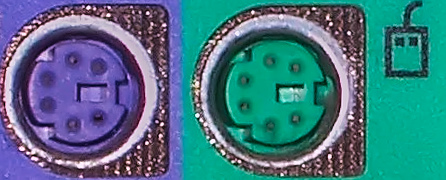
Color codes

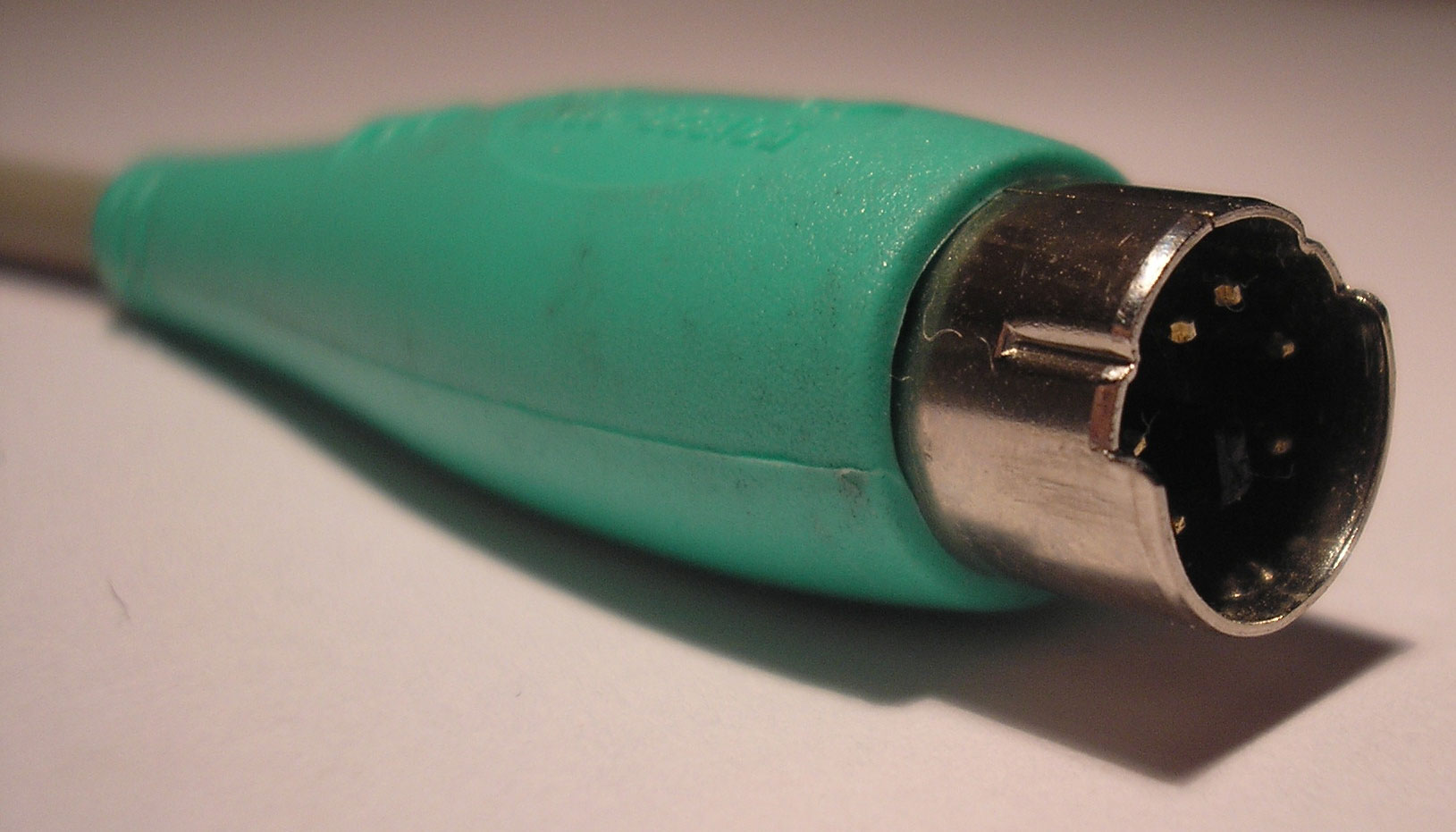
Cable

Mini-DIN connector

=== Serial ===
Serial port

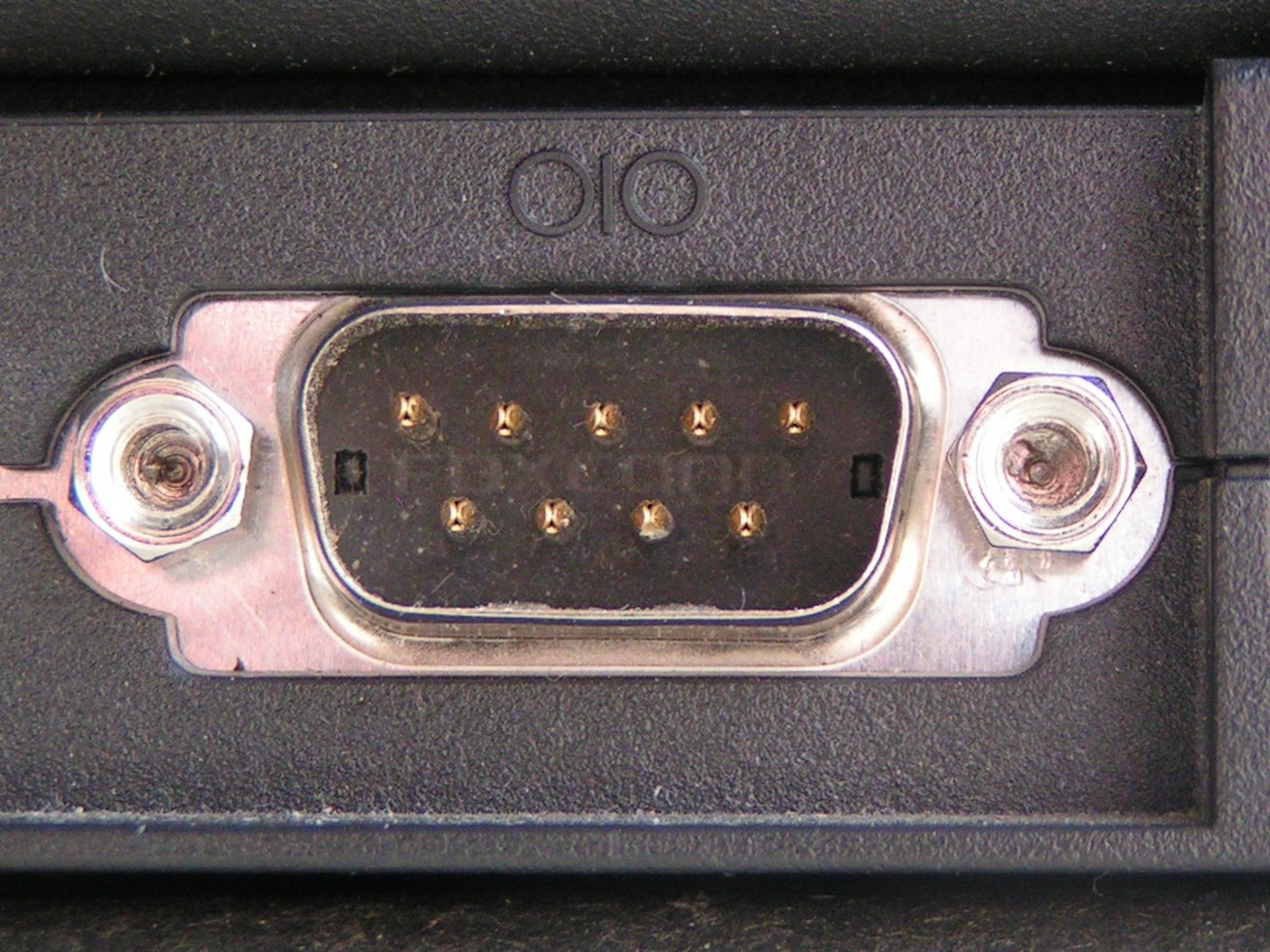
Serial port

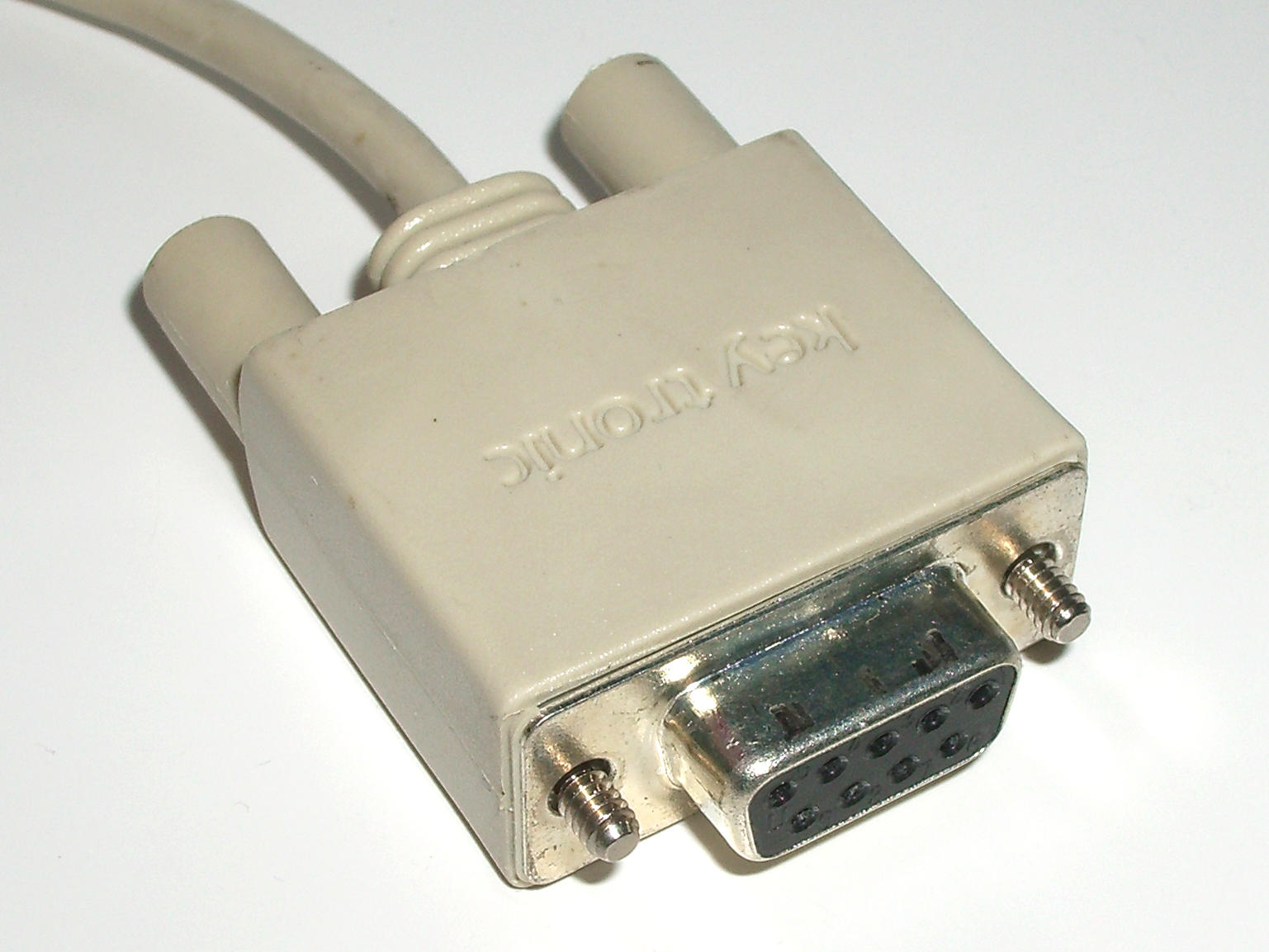
Cable

DE-9
VGA connector

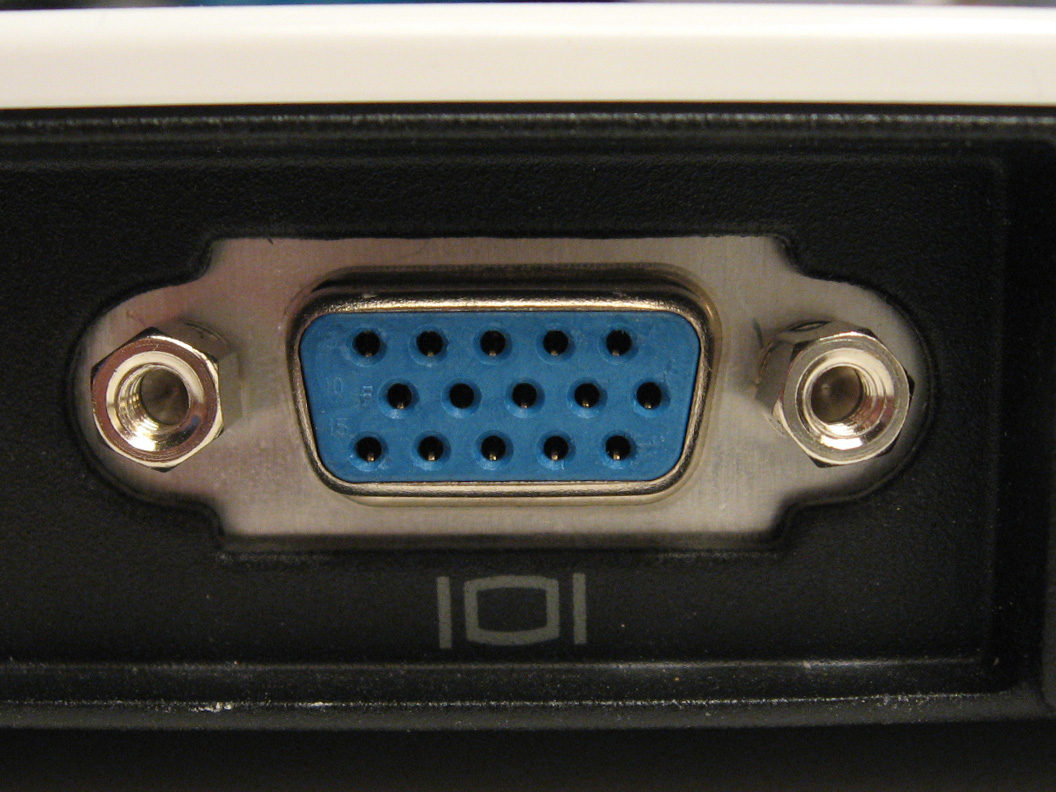
VGA port

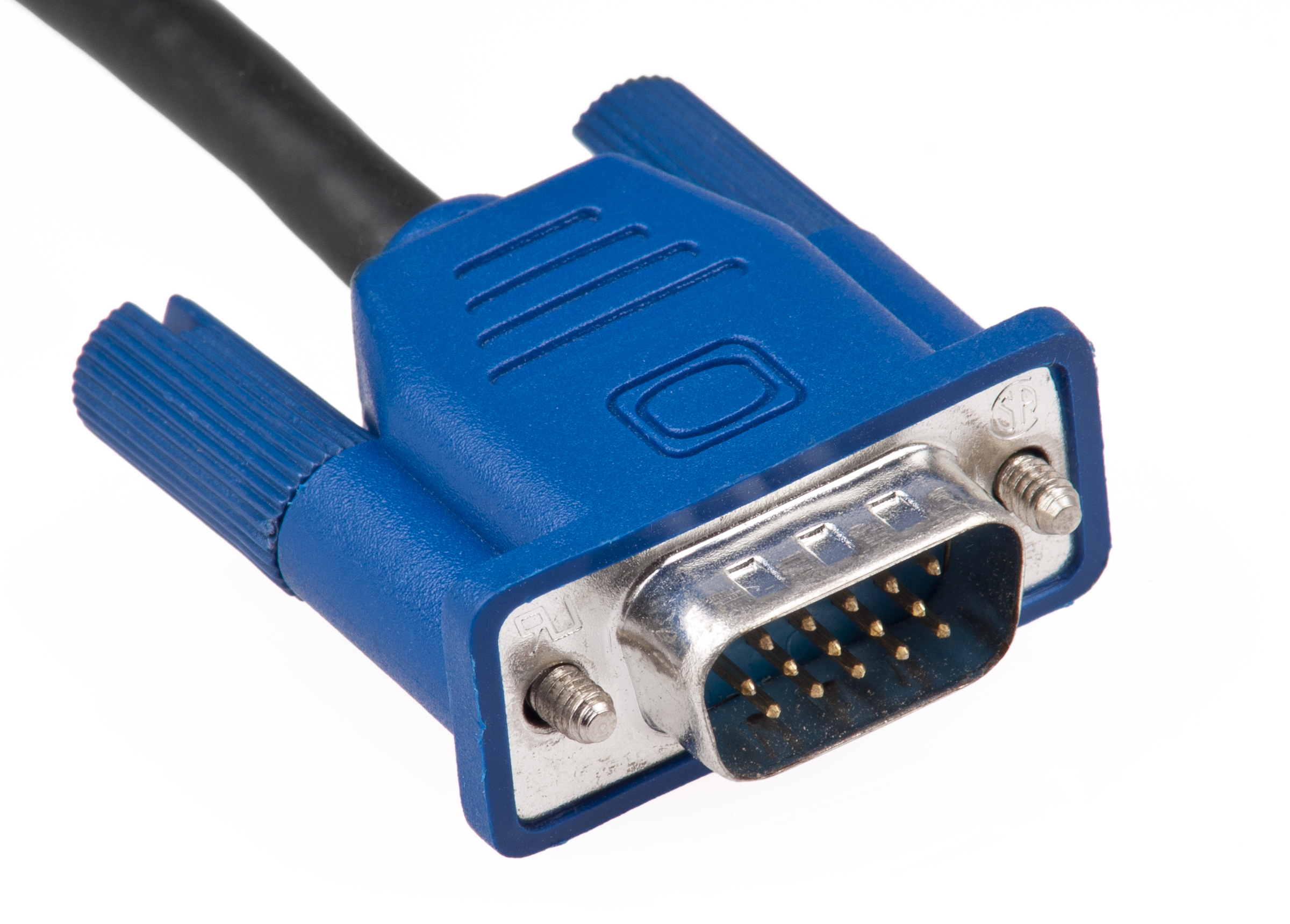
Cable

D-sub 15

=== SCSI ===
SCSI

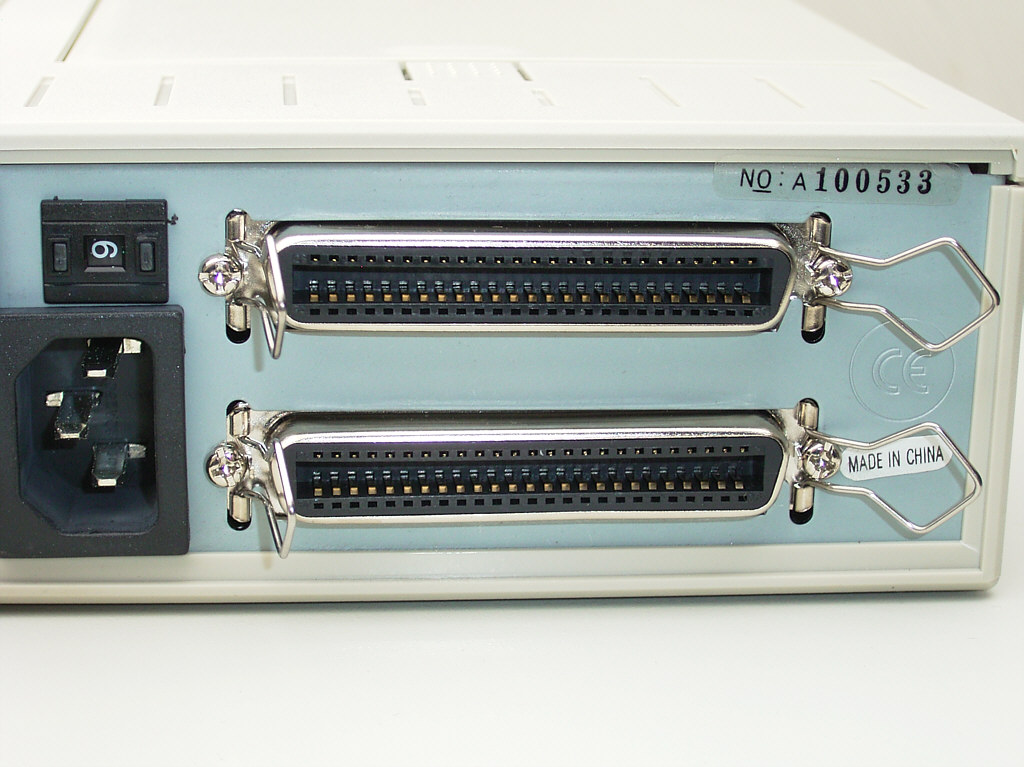
SCSI ports

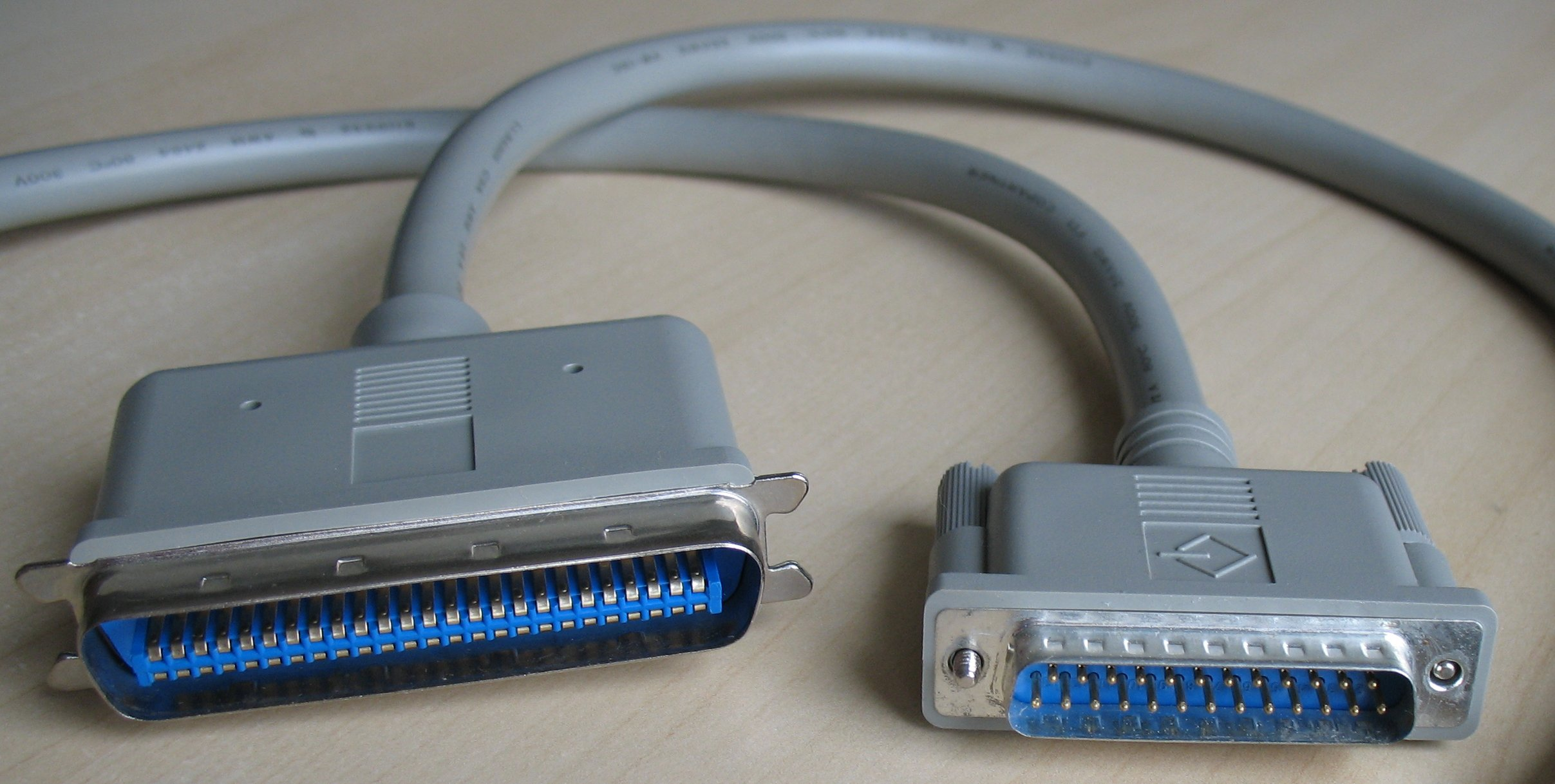
SCSI cables

=== USB ===
USB

USB Ports

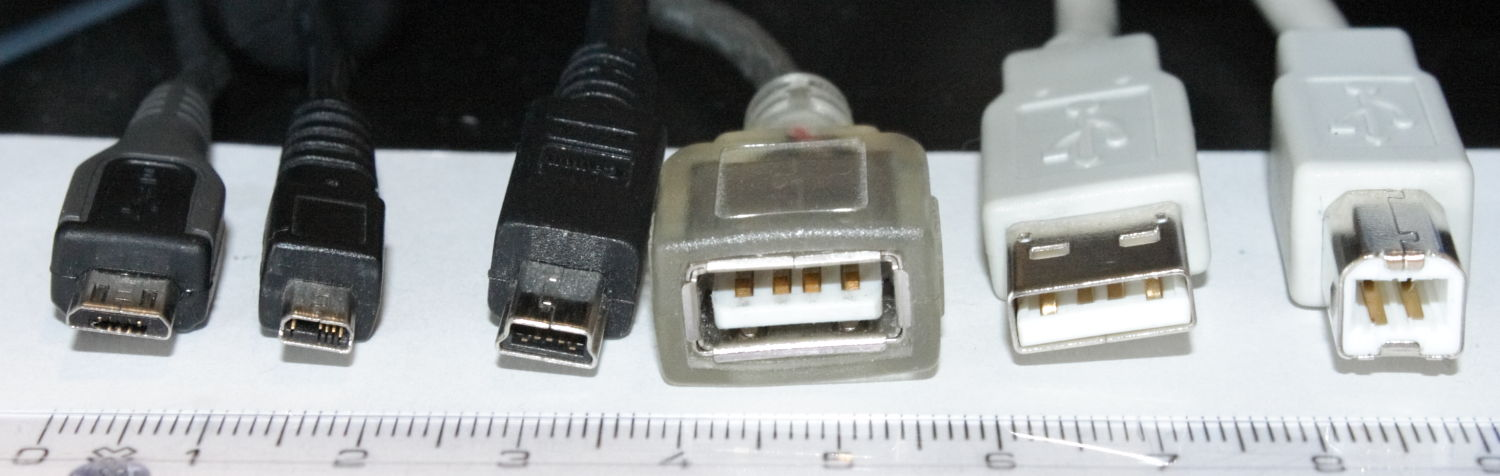
USB Cables

== See also ==
- Audio and video connector
- Bus (computing)
- infographic - What are PC Ports?
