= Balanced audio =

Method of interconnecting audio equipment

An audio signal transmitted over a balanced line. The signal is kept intact while the noise (which appears as a common-mode signal at the receiving end) is rejected perfectly.

Balanced audio is a method of interconnecting audio equipment using balanced interfaces. This type of connection is very important in sound recording and production because it allows the use of long cables while reducing susceptibility to external noise caused by electromagnetic interference. The balanced interface guarantees that induced noise appears as common-mode voltages at the receiver which can be rejected by a differential device.

Balanced connections typically use shielded twisted-pair cable and three-conductor connectors. The connectors are usually three-pin XLR or 1/4 inch (6.35 mm) TRS phone connectors. When used in this manner, each cable carries one channel, therefore stereo audio (for example) would require two of them.

A common misconception is that balanced audio requires the signal source to deliver equal waveforms of opposite polarity to the two signal conductors of the balanced line. However, many balanced devices actively drive only one side of the line, but do so at an impedance that is equal to the impedance of the non-driven side of the line. This impedance balance permits the balanced line receiver (input stage of the next device) to reject common-mode signals introduced to the two conductors by electromagnetic coupling.

== Applications ==
Many microphones operate at low voltage levels and some with high output impedance (hi-Z), which makes long microphone cables especially susceptible to electromagnetic interference. Microphone interconnections are therefore a common application for a balanced interconnection, which allows the receiver to reject most of this induced noise. If the power amplifiers of a public address system are located at any distance from the mixing console, it is also normal to use balanced lines for the signal paths from the mixer to these amplifiers. Many other components, such as graphic equalizers and effects units, have balanced inputs and outputs to allow this. In recording and for short cable runs in general, a compromise is necessary between the noise reduction given by balanced lines and the cost introduced by the extra circuitry they require.

Some devices, usually with a transformer output, provide a balanced output that is "floating" with respect to ground; the impedance to ground from each side of the output is high. More commonly, devices drive one or both sides of the balanced interface with a signal referenced to ground. When one side is not driven, care is taken to assure that the impedance to ground is equal to the impedance of the driven side.

== Interference reduction ==
Balanced audio connections use a number of techniques to reduce noise.

A typical balanced cable contains two identical wires, which are twisted together and then wrapped with a third conductor (foil or braid) that acts as a shield. The two wires form a circuit that can carry an audio signal.

The term balanced comes from the method of balancing the impedance of each wire in the circuit; the line and all circuits directly connected to it (such as the driver and receiver) must have identical impedances with respect to some reference point. This means that much of the electromagnetic interference will induce an equal noise voltage in each wire. Since the differential device at the receiving end only responds to the difference in voltage between the two signal lines, noise that is identical on both wires is rejected. This method can be implemented with a differential amplifier. A transformer may also be used instead of an active input stage.

A twisted pair makes the loop area between the conductors as small as possible, and ensures that a magnetic field that passes equally through adjacent loops will induce equal levels of noise on both lines, which is canceled out by the differential device in the receiver. If the noise source is extremely close to the cable, then it is possible it will be induced on one of the lines more than the other, and it will not be canceled as well, but canceling will still occur to the extent of the amount of noise that is equal on both lines.

The separate shield that is commonly provided in a balanced audio cable also yields a noise rejection advantage over an unbalanced two-conductor arrangement (such as used in typical home stereos) where the shield must also act as the signal return wire. Therefore, any noise currents induced into a balanced audio shield will not be directly modulated onto the signal, whereas in a two-conductor system they will be. This also prevents ground loop problems, by separating the shield/chassis from signal ground.

== Differential signaling ==
Signals are often transmitted over balanced connections using the differential mode, meaning the wires carry signals that are equal in magnitude but of opposite polarity to each other (for instance, in an XLR connector, pin 2 carries the signal with normal polarity, and pin 3 carries an inverted version of the same signal). Despite popular belief, this arrangement is not necessary for noise rejection. As long as the impedances are balanced, noise will couple equally into the two wires (and be rejected by a differential amplifier), regardless of the signal that is present on them. A simple method of driving a balanced line is to inject the signal into the "hot" wire through a known source impedance, and connect the "cold" wire to the signal's local ground reference through an identical impedance. Due to common misconceptions about differential signalling, this is often referred to as a quasi-balanced or impedance-balanced output, though it is, in fact, fully balanced and will reject common-mode interference.

However, there are some minor benefits to driving the line with a fully differential output:

- Though the signal level would not be changed due to nominal level standardization, the maximum output from the differential drivers is twice as much, giving 6 dB extra headroom.
- Increasing cable capacitance over long cable runs decreases the signal level at which high frequencies are attenuated. If each wire carries half the signal voltage swing as in fully differential outputs then longer cable runs can be used without the loss of high frequencies.
- Noise that is correlated between the two amps (from imperfect power supply rejection, for instance), would be cancelled out.
- At higher frequencies, the output impedance of the output amplifier can change, resulting in a small imbalance. When driven in differential mode by two identical amplifiers, this impedance change will be the same for both lines, and thus cancelled out.

== Internally balanced audio design ==
Professional audio products (recording, public address, etc.) generally provide balanced inputs and outputs, typically via XLR or TRS phone connectors. However, in most cases, the internal circuitry is entirely unbalanced.

A small number of audio products have been designed with an entirely balanced signal path from input to output; the circuitry maintains its impedance balance throughout the device. This design is achieved by providing identical (mirrored) internal signal paths for both the "hot" and "cold" conductors. In critical applications, a 100% balanced circuit design can offer better signal integrity by avoiding the extra amplifier stages or transformers required for front-end unbalancing and back-end rebalancing.

== Connectors ==
Three-pin XLR connectors and quarter-inch (¼" or 6.35 mm) TRS phone connectors are commonly used for balanced audio interfaces. Many jacks are now designed to take either XLR or TRS phone plugs. Equipment intended for long-term installation sometimes uses terminal strips or Euroblock connectors. Some balanced headphone connections also use a Pentaconn 4.4 mm TRRRS connector.

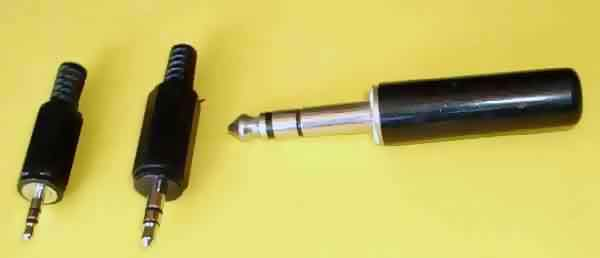
2.5, 3.5 and 6.35 mm TRS phone plugs

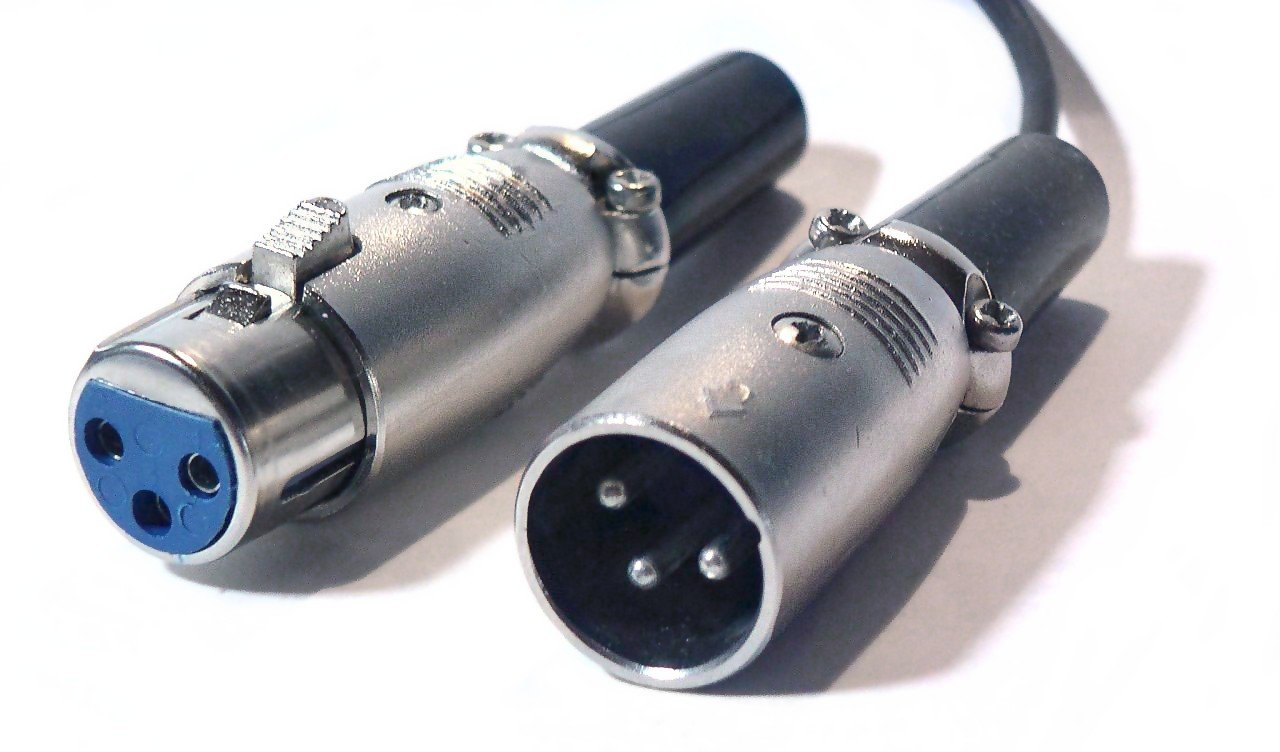
Three-pin XLR connectors, female on left and male on right

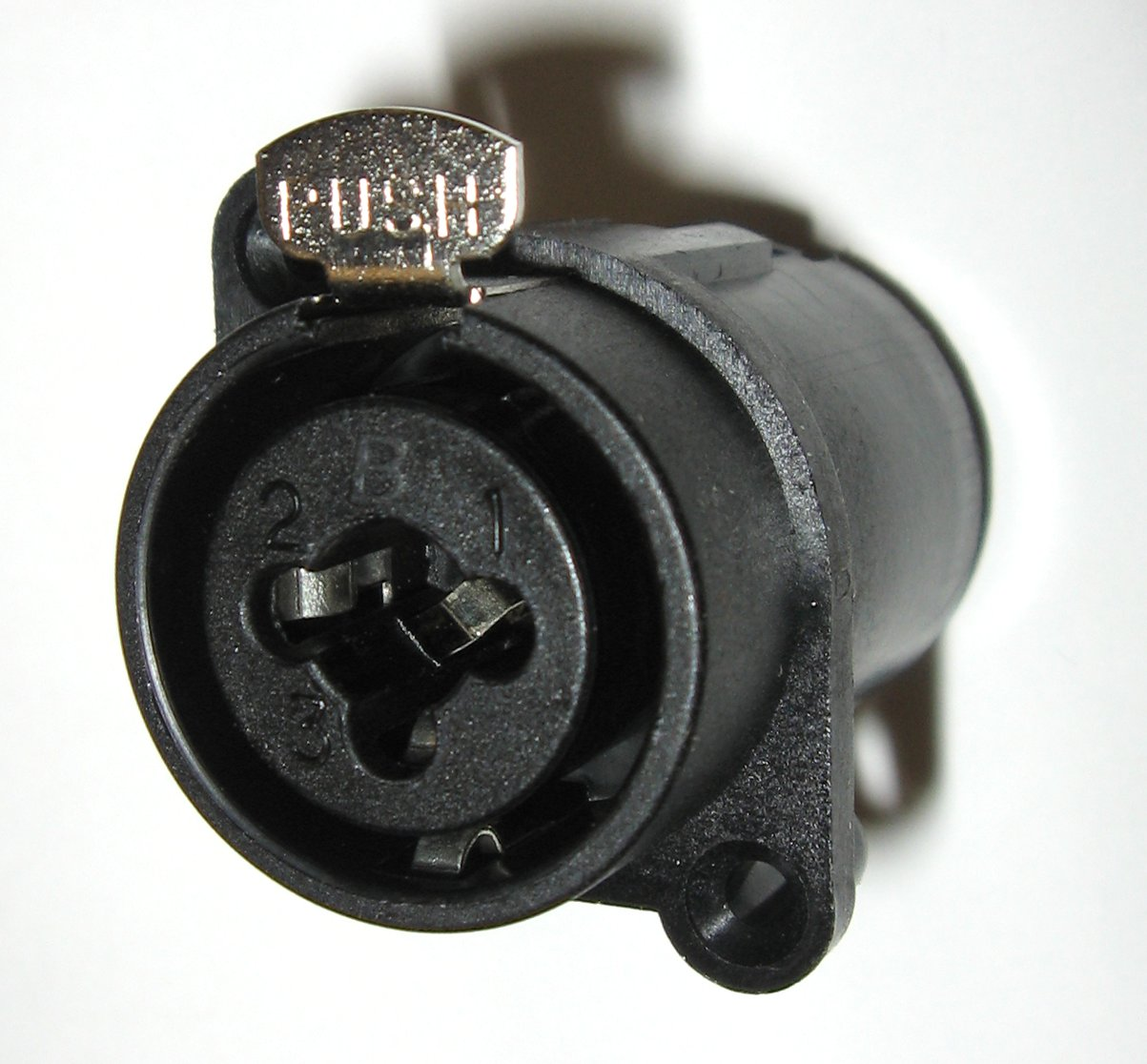
Three-pin XLR plus 6.35 mm TRS phone hybrid jack.

With XLR connectors, pins 1, 2, and 3 are usually used for the shield (ideally connected to the chassis) and the two signal wires, respectively. (The phrase "ground, live, return", corresponding to "X, L, R", is often offered as a memory aid, although the second signal wire is not a "return" in the case of differential signaling) On TRS phone plugs, the tip is signal/non-inverting, the ring is return/inverting, and the sleeve is chassis ground.

If a stereophonic or other binaural signal is plugged into such a jack, one channel (usually the right) will be subtracted from the other (usually the left), leaving an unlistenable L − R (left minus right) signal instead of normal monophonic L + R (left plus right). Reversing the polarity at any other point in a balanced audio system will also result in this effect at some point when it is later mixed-down with its other channel.

Telephone lines also carry audio through balanced circuitry, though this is generally now limited to the local loop. It is called this because the two wires form a balanced loop through which both sides of the telephone call travel. As telephones require DC power to operate and to allow simple on/off hook detection, extra circuitry was developed where one signal wire is fed from the exchange power bus, typically −50 volts, and the other grounded, both via equal value inductors which have about 400 ohms DC resistance, to avoid short-circuiting the wanted AC signal and to maintain impedance balance.

Digital audio connections in professional environments are also frequently balanced, normally following the AES3 (AES/EBU) standard. This uses XLR connectors and twisted-pair cable with 110-ohm impedance. By contrast, the coaxial S/PDIF interface commonly seen on consumer equipment is unbalanced.

== Converters ==
Balanced and unbalanced circuits can be interfaced by the use of a balun, often through a DI unit (also called a "DI box" or "direct box").

As a last resort a balanced audio line can be fed into an unbalanced input and vice versa as long as the electronic design used for the output stage is known. In the case of balanced output to unbalanced input, the negative output can be tied to ground, but in certain cases the negative output should be left disconnected.

== See also ==
- Differential signaling
- AES3
- Phantom power
