= Shielded cable =

Electric cable with metal jacket (shield) to prevent magnetic interference

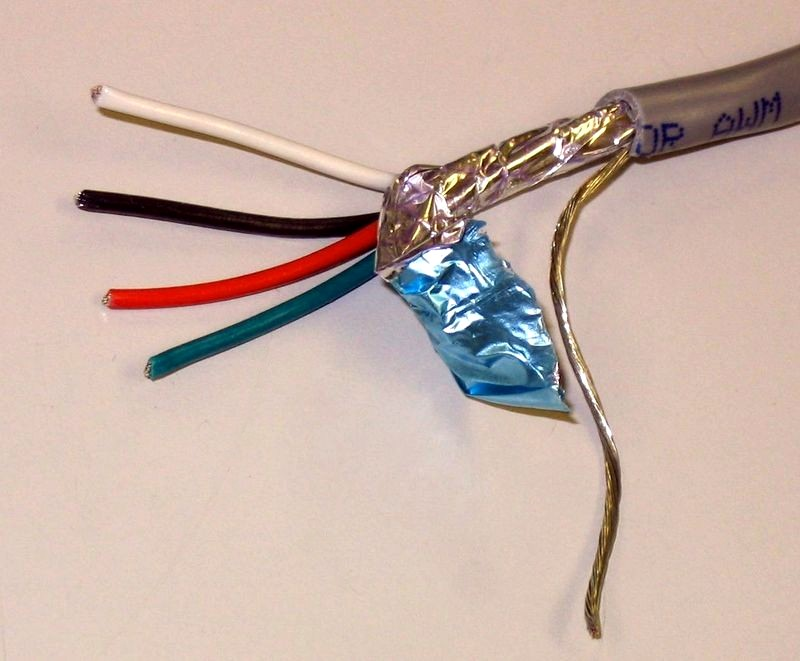
Four-conductor shielded cable with metal foil shield and drain wire.

Coaxial cable.

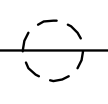
Electronic symbol for a shielded wire

A shielded cable or screened cable is an electrical cable that has a common conductive layer around its conductors for electromagnetic shielding. This shield is usually covered by an outermost layer of the cable. Common types of cable shielding can most broadly be categorized as foil type (often utilizing a metallised film), contraspiralling wire strands (braided or unbraided) or both. A longitudinal wire may be necessary with dielectric spiral foils to short out each turn.

The shield acts as a Faraday cage – a surface that reflects electromagnetic radiation. This reduces both the interference from outside noise onto the signals and the signals from radiating out and potentially disturbing other devices (see electromagnetic compatibility). To be effective against electric fields (see also capacitive coupling), the shield must be grounded. The shield should be electrically continuous to maximize effectiveness, including any cable splices. For high frequency signals (above a few megahertz), this extends to connectors and enclosures, also circumferentially: The cable shielding needs to be circumferentially connected to the enclosure, if any, through the connector or cable gland.

Some types of shielded cable use the shield as the return path for the signal. As contrasting examples, coaxial cable does, whereas twinax cable does not.

High voltage power cables with solid insulation are shielded to protect the cable insulation, people and equipment.

== Types ==
There are many types of cable shields available commercially, and usage depends on the application.

- Combination shields
- Foil shields
- Metallic braid shields
- Spiral shields
- Serve shields
- Tape shields
- Screen shields

== Applications ==
The use of shielded cables in security systems provides some protection from power frequency and radio frequency interference, reducing the number of false alarms being generated. The best practice is to keep data or signal cables physically separated by at least 3 inches (75mm) from 'heavy' power circuits which are in parallel.

Analog signal cable used in professional audio applications is usually shielded twisted pair cable terminated in XLR connectors. The twisted pair carries the signal in a balanced audio configuration. The audio multicore cable laid from the stage to the mixing console is also shielded.

Consumers use screened copper wire with one central conductor in an unbalanced configuration.

== In signal cables ==
The best way to wire shielded cables for screening is to ground the shield at both ends of the cable. Traditionally there existed a rule of thumb to ground only the source end of the shield to avoid ground loops. Best practice is to ground at both ends, but there is a possibility of ground loops. In airplanes, special cable is used with both an outer shield to protect against lightning and an inner shield grounded at one end to eliminate hum from the 400 Hz power system.

== In power cables ==
Medium and high-voltage power cables, in circuits over 2000 volts, usually have a shield layer of copper or aluminium tape or conducting polymer. If an unshielded insulated cable is in contact with earth or a grounded object, the electrostatic field around the conductor will be concentrated at the contact point, resulting in corona discharge, and eventual destruction of the insulation. Leakage current and capacitive current through the insulation presents a danger of electrical shock. The grounded shield equalizes electrical stress around the conductor, diverts any leakage current to ground. Stress relief cones should be applied at the shield ends, especially for cables operating at more than 2 kV to earth.

Shields on power cables may be connected to earth ground at each shield end and at splices for redundancy to prevent shock even though induced current will flow in the shield. This current will produce losses and heating and will reduce the maximum current rating of the circuit. Tests show that having a bare grounding conductor adjacent to the insulated wires will conduct the fault current to earth more quickly. On high-current circuits the shields might be connected only at one end. On very long high-voltage circuits, the shield may be broken into several sections since a long shield run may rise to dangerous voltages during a circuit fault. There is a risk of shock hazard from having only one end of the shield grounded. The maximum recommended shield potential rise is 25 volts. IEEE 422 and 525 lists the cable lengths that would limit shield potential to 25 volts for a single point ground application.

Size Conductor	One Cable per Duct (ft)	Three Cables per Duct (ft)
1/0 AWG	1250	4500
2/0 AWG	1110	3970
4/0 AWG	865	3000
250 kcmil	815	2730
350 kcmil	710	2260
400 kcmil	655	2100
500 kcmil	580	1870
750 kcmil	510	1500
1000 kcmil	450	-
2000 kcmil	340	-

== See also ==
- Electromagnetic shielding
- Speaker wire
- Door loop, a method for mechanically protecting electric cabling to a door
