= D-subminiature military =

Electric/data connector used in aerospace, military, aviation, and electric cars

The D subminiature military is a Cannon connector used in aerospace, military, aviation, and electric cars. It is also manufactured by other companies besides Cannon ITT. It has seven pins in a housing the same size as the standard 9-pin or 15-pin D-sub. There are five pins in two central rows and two large pins, one at each end. UL file number E8572.

The D-sub military is used in commercial aircraft and the General Motors EV1 and General Motors Chevrolet S10-EV electric vehicles.

In the GM electric car range, it is used to join the Power Inverter Module (PIM) to the Auxiliary Power Module (APM). Only four pins are used. The two large pins carry the approximately 400 V power supply to the APU and pins 1 and 5 carry the auto disconnect loop. The auto disconnect loop is terminated with a loop between pins 1 and 5 inside the APU on the back of the connector. Male part number = ITT 9649 DAM43400-85.
