= Neutrik XLR/P10 =

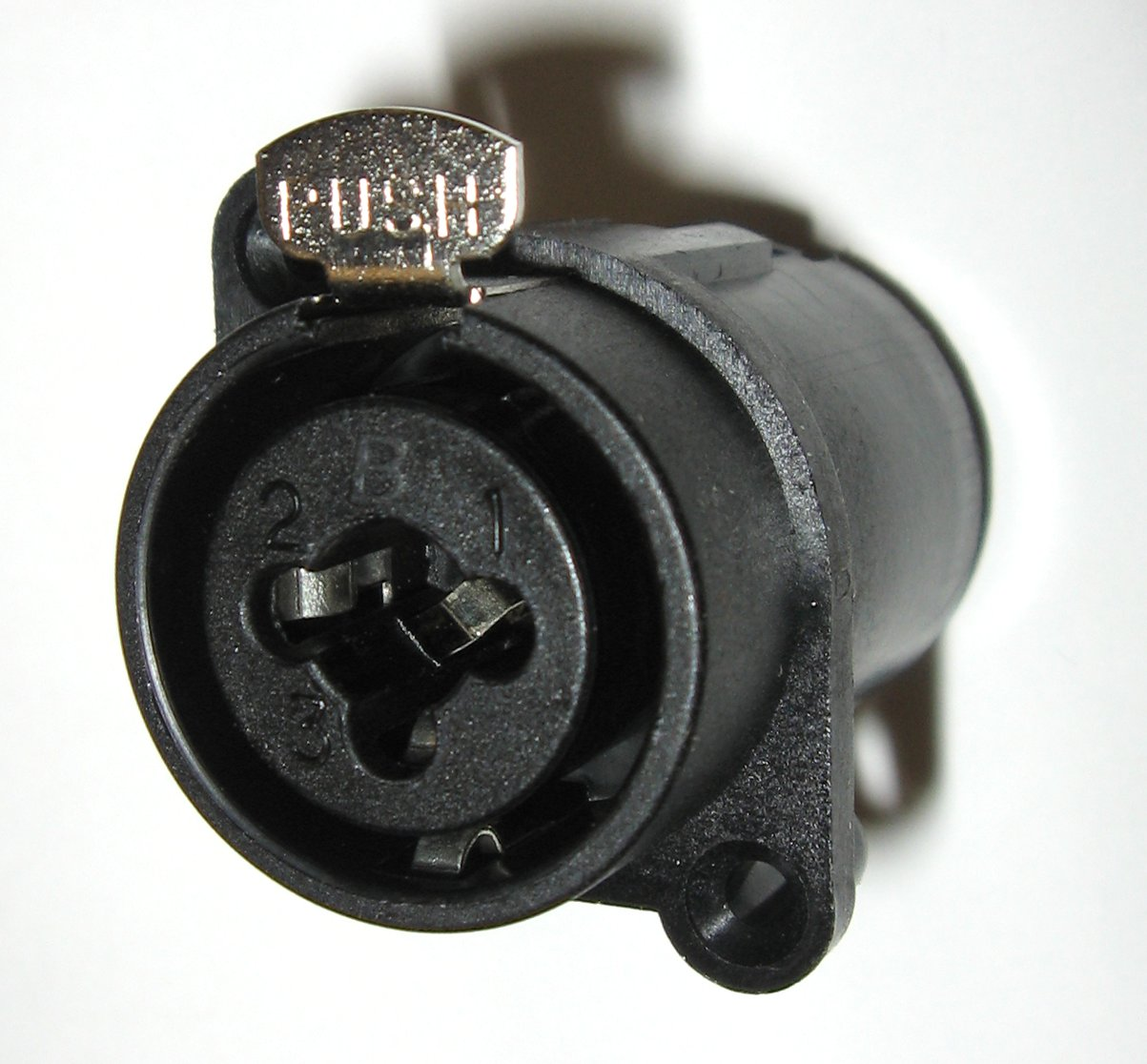
- Combo connector XLR + TRS phone jack 1/4"
- Type: Audio

Production history
- Designer: Neutrik

The Combo XLR/TRS socket or Neutrik NCJ6FI-S, is a type of female socket connector capable of supporting two types of jack connectors: the XLR connector, known as the "Cannon Plug", used to connect microphones and mixers, and the TRS plug for stereo (TRS:Tip-ring-sleeve) or TS plug for mono (TS:Tip-Sleeve), also known as: Banana Plug, or P10 plug, which are used in musical instruments like guitars, keyboards, bass, and other instruments.

== History ==
At the 1964 Winter Olympics in Innsbruck, the Tyrolean acoustics engineer Bernhard Weingartner noticed that the sound volume tended to decrease with a loss of quality. The reason for this was that the DIN audio connectors used by Austrian television failed under the influence of bad weather. Weingartner knew that the XLR connector designed by ITT Cannon International /Switchcraft would be much more reliable, but these connectors were very expensive and not available in Europe. Weingartner began in 1974, initially on his own, with the development of an inexpensive but high-quality version of the XLR connector. The cartoonist Werner Bachmann joined them seven months later. Neutrik AG was founded in 1975 by Bernhard Weingartner and investors Gebhard Sprenger and Josef Gstöhl. Over the following years, the Neutrik company became the world leader in the XLR audio connector market. Neutrik connectors have been standardized to the stage and studio standard as standard IEC 61076-2-103 . Finally, in 1987, Neutrik connectors were developed based on an invention and patent by Bernhard Weingartner.

== Characteristics ==
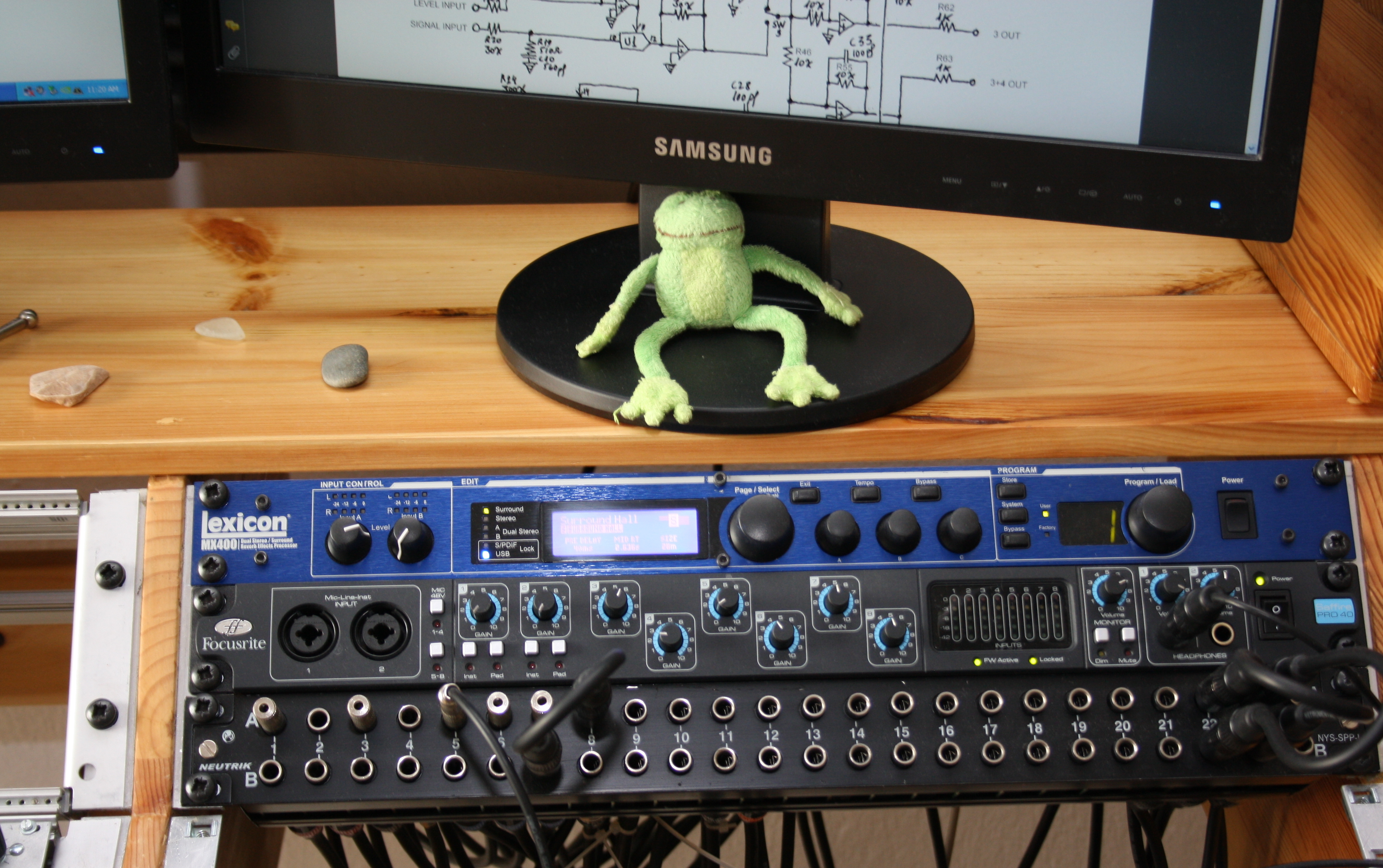
Vocal processor with 2 Combo XLR + TRS jacks

Because amplifier and mixer equipment often requires inputs for both TRS phone jacks and XLR connectors, Neutrik and Amphenol offer several combo connector models that accept both XLR 6.5 mm (0.26 in) and jacks like TS or TRS phone jacks. In the image on the right, one can see the front of a Lexikon vocal processor with 2 XLR/P10 Neutrik female NCJ6FI-S combo connectors, with a body made of solid plastic and with the solder pins located on the back of the plug, to facilitate soldering.

The standard signal flow for audio on XLR connectors is that the output is a male connector and the input is female. In other words, the pins on the plug point in the direction of signal flow. Phantom power, if used, originates from the plug and flows into the plug, (the opposite direction to the signal and the normal direction of the power circuits). Line level and microphone audio signal voltages are not dangerous. The male XLR is usually built into the body of a microphone . The EIA RS-297-A standard describes the use of the three-pin XLR, known as XLR3, for balanced audio signal level applications :

Pin	function
1	Chassis ground (cable shield)
2	Positive polarity terminal for balanced (a.k.a.: "hot") audio circuits
3	Negative polarity terminal for balanced circuits (a.k.a.: "cold")

== Awards ==
NEUTRIK won the 2011 EMEA+ InAVation Award in the category "Most Innovative Commercial AV Accessory 2011". The award was presented at Integrated Systems Europe 2011 in Amsterdam.
