= List of aviation headset connectors =

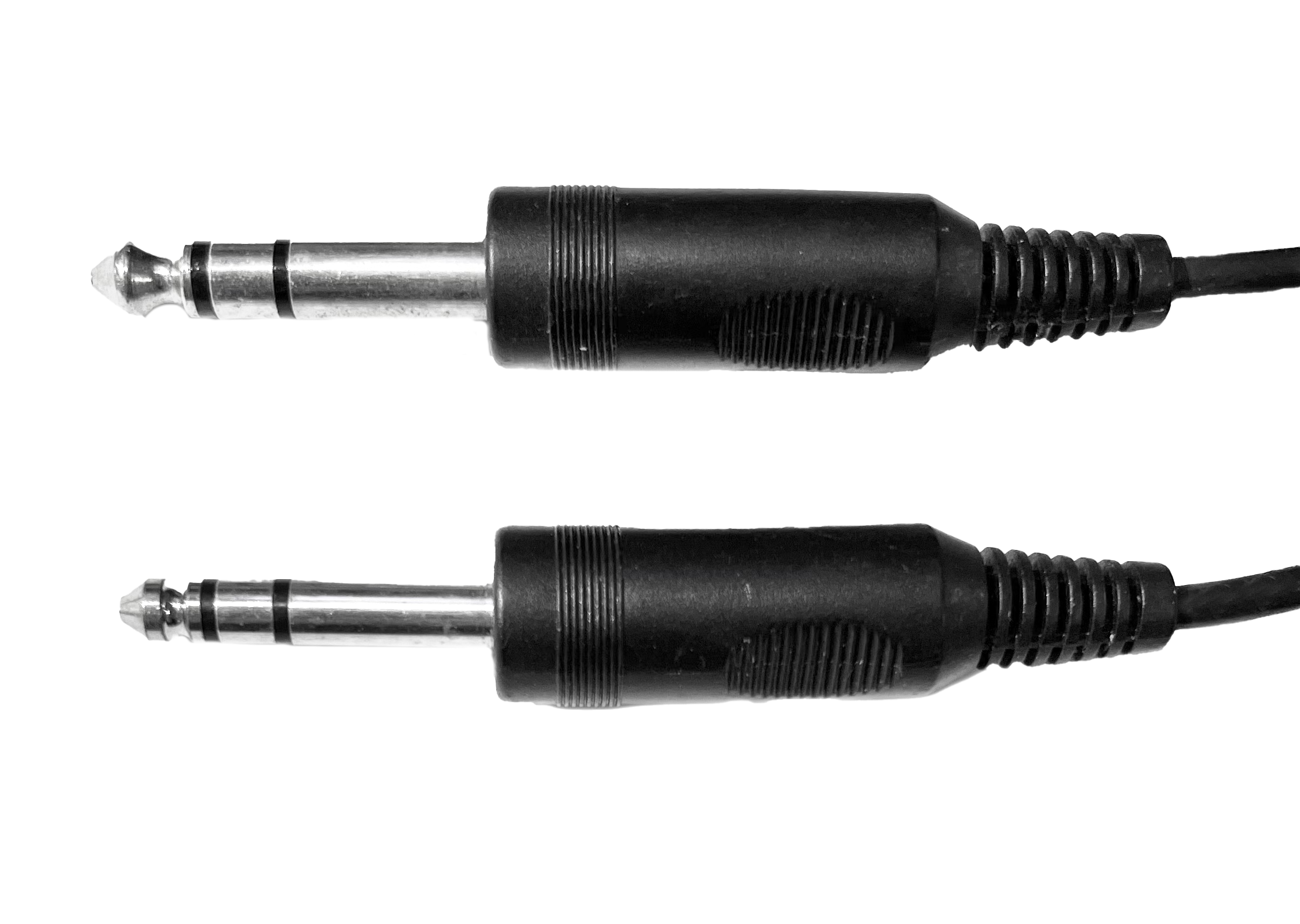
PJ-055 (top) and PJ-068 (bottom) General Aviation Audio Phone Connectors

"NATO" plug type, commonly used on military aircraft and civil helicopters

The following electrical connectors are commonly used in aviation headsets:

- Phone connectors
  - A pair of plugs, known as "GA" or general aviation plugs. 1/4-inch plug for audio (PJ-055), and a 3/16-inch plug for the microphone (PJ-068)
  - U-174/U (Nexus TP-101), U-93A/U (Nexus TP-102), and Nexus TP-120, also known as US NATO, commonly used in helicopters, with a diameter of 0.281 in (7.1 mm) and length 0.761 in (19.3 mm). The TP-120 (also known as J11) is standard for external jack plugs on most Boeing and Airbus airliners, used by ground-crew
  - U-384/U (Nexus TP-105), similar to U-174/U but with 5 conductors and slightly longer length of 0.901 in (22.9 mm)
  - Type 671, also known as UK NATO or European NATO 10H/18575, with a diameter of 7.57 mm (0.298 in). NATO Stock Number 5935-99-946-6652.
- XLR 5, used internally on Airbus aircraft
- REDEL 6-pin connector by LEMO, known as "LEMO plugs". Most Cirrus aircraft use this connector.
- Fischer 8-pin connector, used in Agusta helicopters
- Neutrik neutriCON 8-pin connector

The XLR, LEMO and Fischer plugs are able to supply power for active noise cancellation.

== Certifications ==
In the United States, the Federal Aviation Administration (FAA) issues Technical Standard Orders (TSOs) regarding equipment used on civil aircraft. The TSO for aviation headsets is C139, which includes requirements to withstand extreme heat and cold, decompression, and electromagnetic interference. Some commercial airlines require the use of TSO-compliant headsets, as part of their operations manual. This is a choice by the airline, not an FAA requirement.

In Europe, the European Union Aviation Safety Agency (EASA) also issues TSOs. The TSO for aviation headsets is ETSO-C139. Again, this is not mandatory but may be required by an airline.
