= Diwa =

Diwa or DIWA may refer to:

- Diva, Maharashtra, India
- A Directory of Important Wetlands in Australia
- Diwa: Studies in Philosophy and Theology
- Ladislao Diwa (1863–1930), Filipino patriot
- Tropical Storm Diwa
- Voith DIWA, a bus transmission
- DIgital Wireless Audio, a 5 GHz wireless audio network from Neutrik
- Noureddine Diwa (1937-2020), Tunisian footballer
- Gabrielle Diwa, Marvel Comics character also known as Galura
