= PowerCon =

Electrical connector used in stagecraft

powerCON is an electrical connector for connecting mains power to equipment in confined spaces. It resembles and functions similarly to the Speakon connector: the line connector is inserted into the chassis connector and then twisted to establish contact and lock. Both the line and chassis connectors remain fully insulated even when disconnected.

The principal advantages of powerCON include its high current capacity in a compact space – it is smaller than an IEC connector yet provides double the current-carrying capacity – and its effective locking action. Its drawbacks are chiefly cost and reliance on a single primary vendor. Additionally, older models are not designed to be connected or disconnected under load, rendering them unsuitable for use by untrained personnel.

== Applications ==
powerCON connectors are most commonly employed as power inlets on professional audio, video, and lighting equipment. In many cases, power outlets (typically light grey) are used to daisy-chain LED-based luminaires or to supply power to panels forming a video wall during concerts.

They are utilised in countries with both 120 and 230 volt mains supplies, as well as with 240 volt North American plugs (such as the L6-20P); therefore, it is essential to ensure that the supply and load voltages are compatible. Because these connectors are largely unfamiliar to the public, they may be installed in semi-public locations where discreet power outlets are required. For example, on the XPT, powerCON connectors are used to power nebulisers, thereby preventing passengers from using the outlets to charge mobile phones or laptops.

== Specifications ==
=== Types A and B ===
It is available in two deliberately incompatible variants to prevent the connection of two mains supplies. Couplers incorporating one chassis socket of each type are available to extend cables.

The type A connector is blue and intended for power sources (with power flowing from a blue-ended cable into a chassis socket).

The type B connector is grey and used for power drains (with power flowing from a chassis socket into a grey-ended cable).

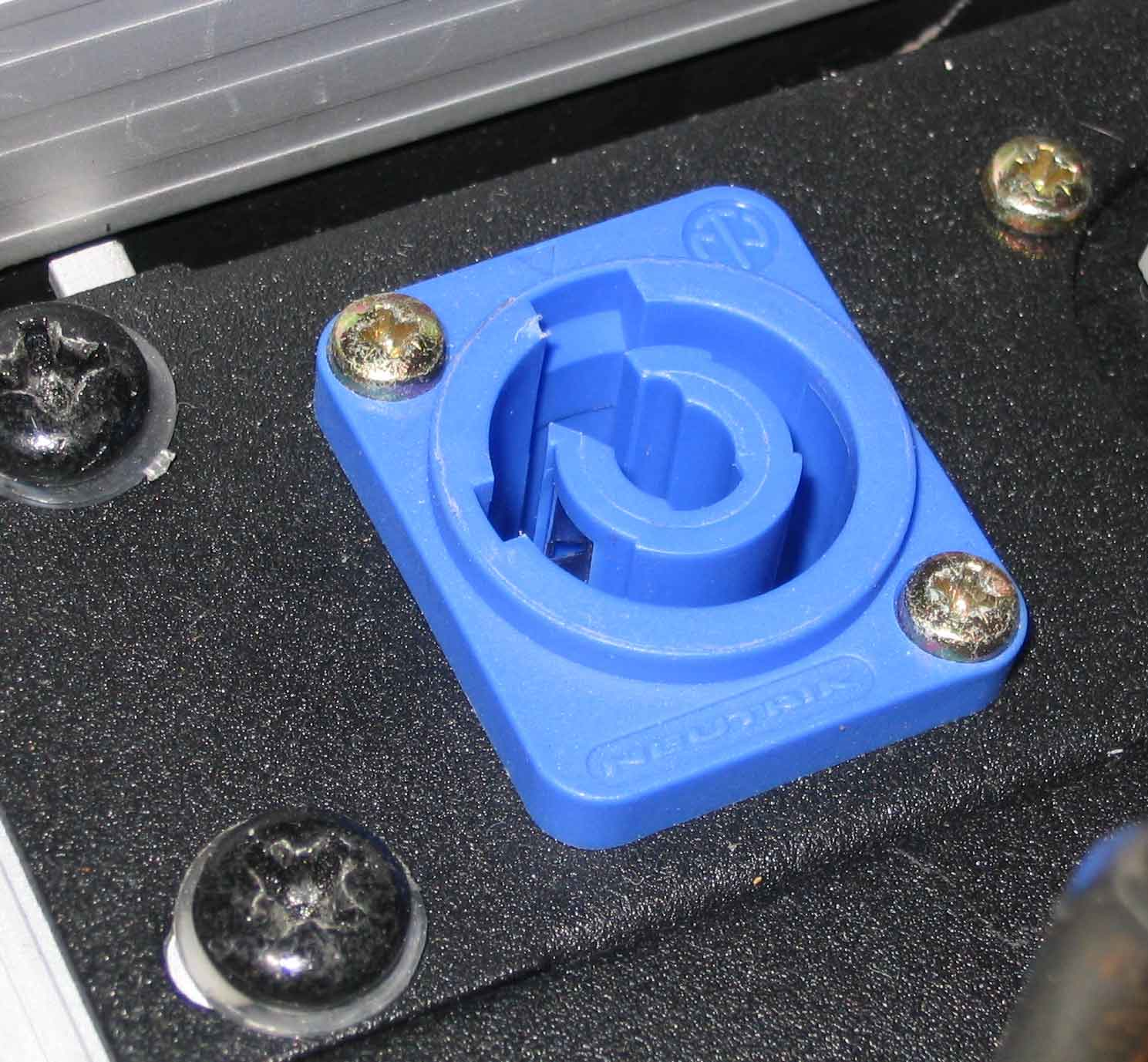
Type A male (chassis mount) connector

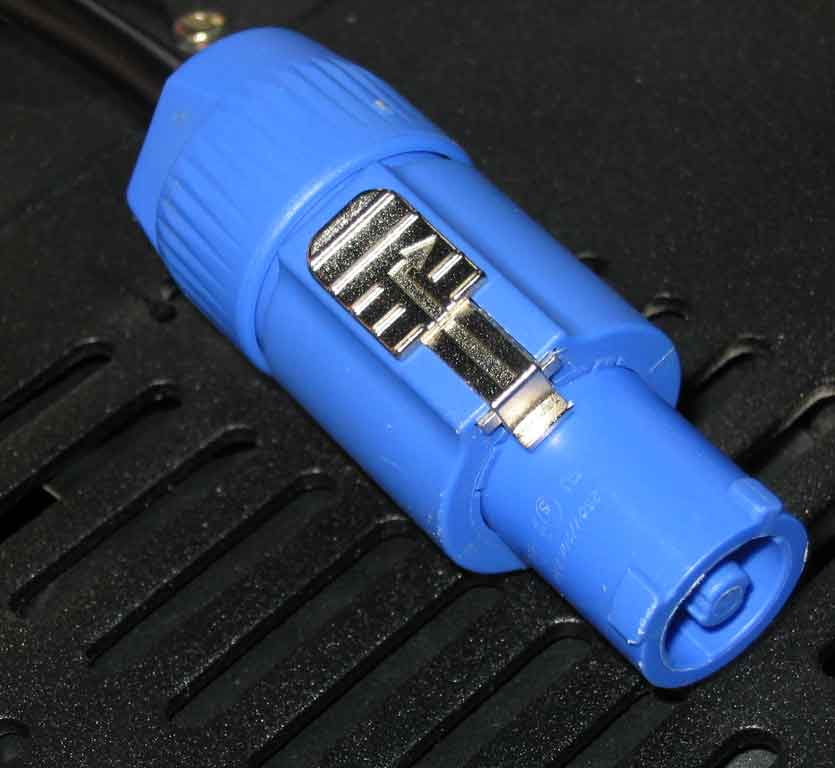
Type A female (cable) connector

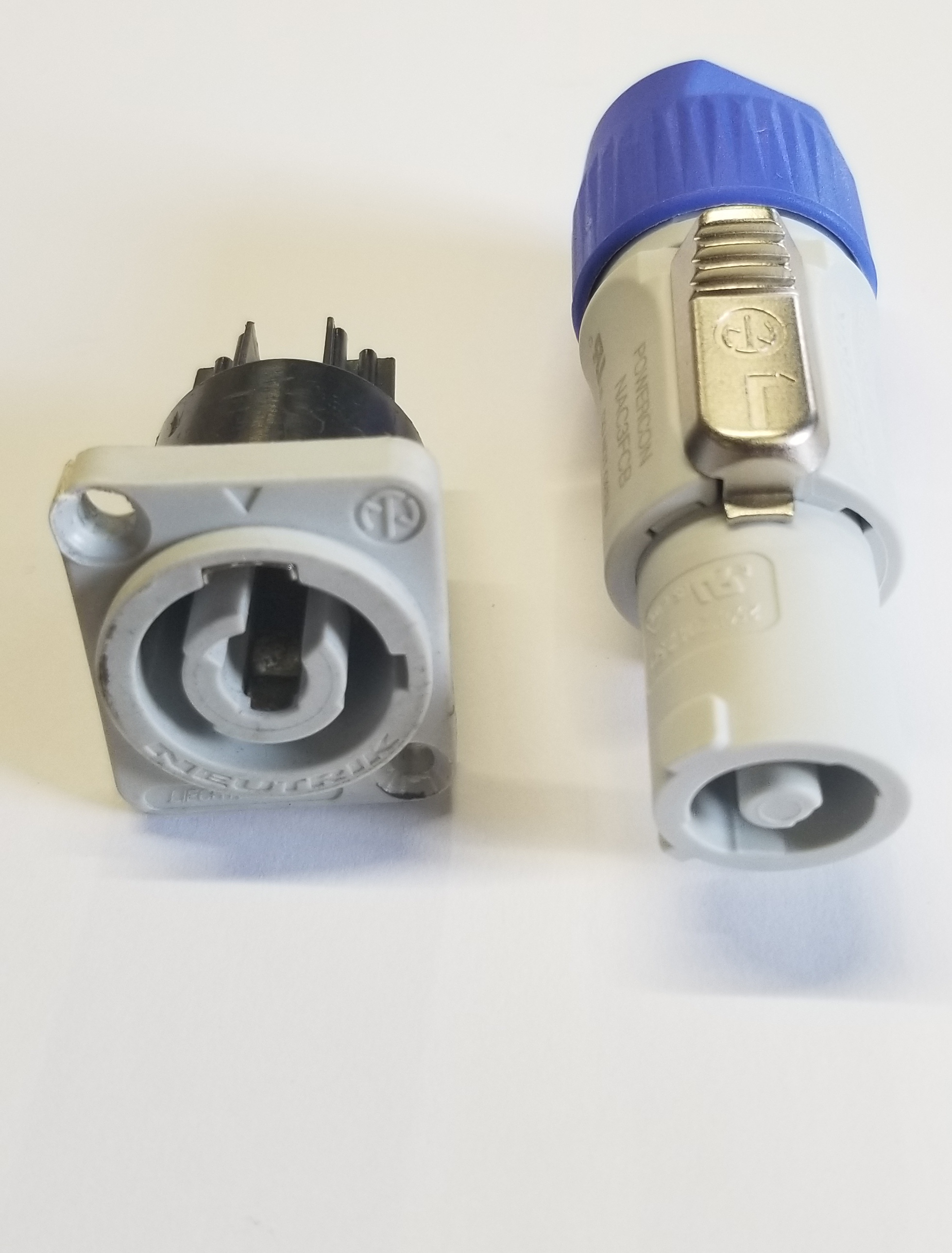
Type B male (chassis mount) and female (cable) connectors

=== Power rating ===
All powerCON connectors are rated for voltages up to 250 V AC.

Most variants, including the original, are rated at 20 A. In December 2013, Neutrik introduced a larger 32 A version of the powerCON. It is only available in type A, intended for use as a source. XX Series connectors (with circuit breaking capability) are rated at 16 A at 250 V and 20 A at 127 V.

=== Environmental sealing ===
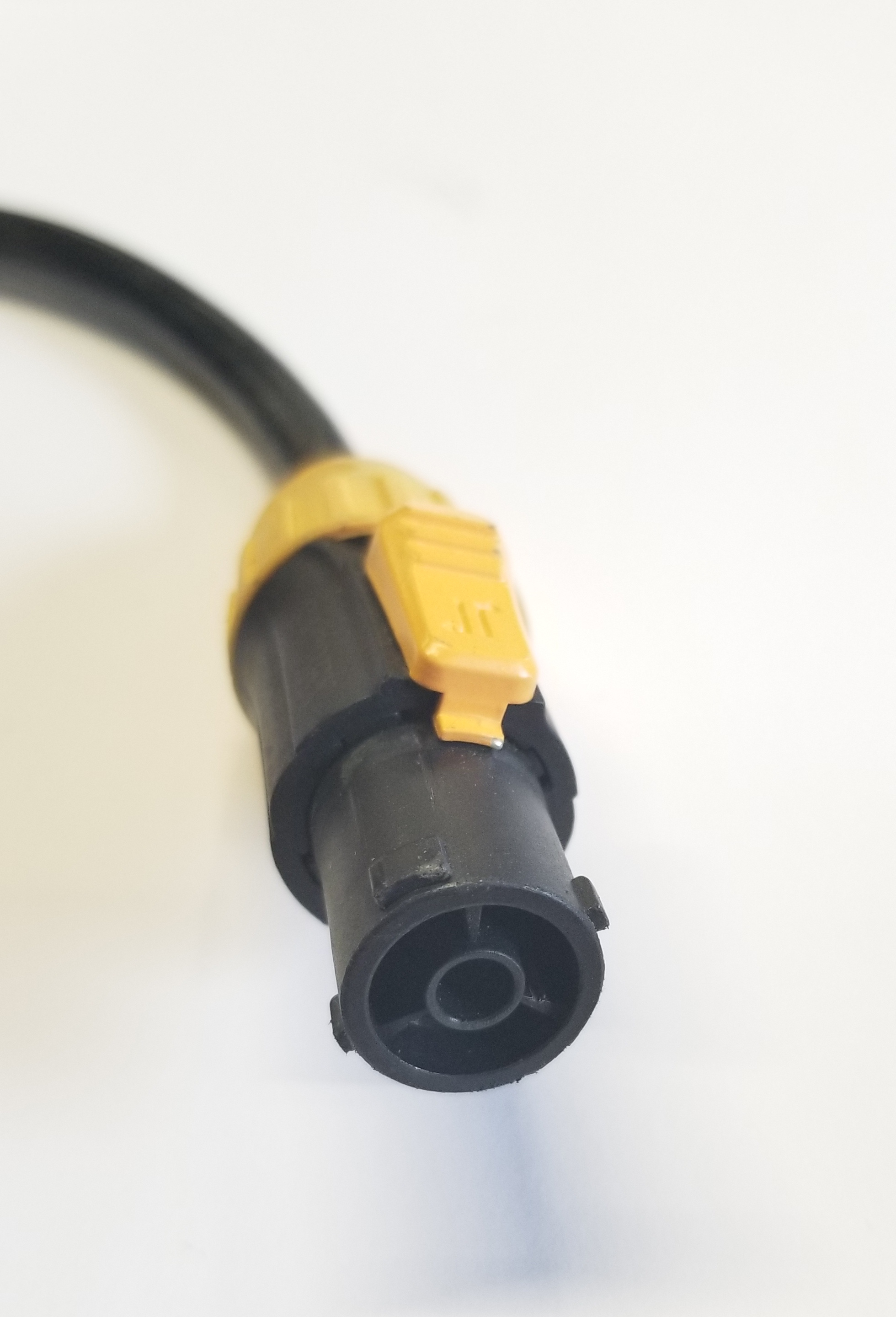
Neutrik powerCON TRUE1 female cable connector NAC3FX-W

In January 2011, Neutrik announced a new variant called the powerCON TRUE1. When mated together, the connectors achieve an IP65 rating and are certified as UL50E, making them suitable for outdoor environments with heavy dust or water exposure. Unlike traditional powerCON connectors, this new variant is specified with a breaking capacity, meaning it is designed for disconnection under load. Its maximum current rating is reduced to 16 A, and it is not compatible with the traditional powerCON connectors.

=== Breaking capacity ===
At the end of 2020, Neutrik released a redesigned version of the original powerCON that can be connected and disconnected under load when mated with the corresponding connectors. This advancement permits a claim of compliance with IEC EN 60320-1.

Cable connectors with breaking capacity are identified by the "-1" in their article number (for example, NAC3FCA-1), while appliance connectors are recognisable by their black colouring and the "XX" added in their article number (for instance, NAC3MPXXA). Identification is confirmed by the blue or grey band on the cable retention nut.

== Vendors ==
PowerCON connectors are designed and manufactured by Neutrik.

Amphenol makes plug-compatible connectors, marketed under the HP and HPT product names.
