= Speakon connector =

Cable connector for connecting loudspeakers to amplifiers

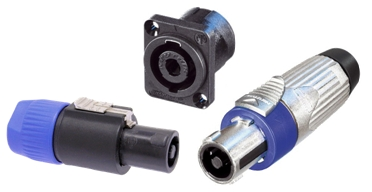
Neutrik Speakon. The connector barrels are 26 millimetres (1.024 in) overall diameter.

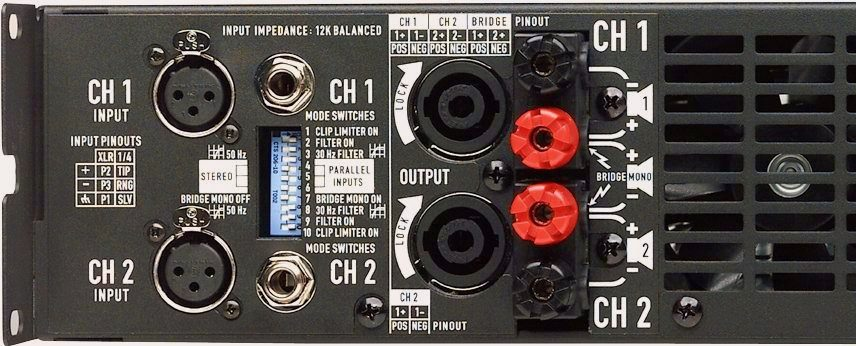
Speakon panel connectors (center) provided on a professional PA power amplifier by QSC with a power output of 2 x 700 Watt (4 Ohm)

The Speakon (stylized speakON) is a trademarked name for an electrical connector, originally manufactured by Neutrik, mostly used in professional audio systems for connecting loudspeakers to amplifiers. Other manufacturers make compatible products, often under the name "speaker twist connector".

Speakon connectors are rated for at least 30 A RMS continuous current, higher than 1/4-inch TS phone connectors, two-pole twist lock, and XLR connectors for loudspeakers.

== Design ==
A Speakon connector is designed with a locking system that may be designed for soldered or screw-type connections. Line connectors (usually FEMALE with the latch) mate with (usually MALE) panel connectors and typically a cable will have identical connectors at both ends. If it is needed to join cables, a coupler can be used (which essentially consists of two panel connectors mounted on the ends of a plastic tube). The design was conceived in 1987.

Because many users are confused by whether connectors are male or female, Speakon connectors often include a "M" or "F" printed on them to ease the ambiguity.

Speakon connectors are designed to be unambiguous in their use in speaker cables. With 1/4" speaker jacks and XLR connections, it is possible for users to erroneously use low-current shielded microphone or instrument cables in a high-current speaker application. Speakon cables are intended solely for use in high-current audio applications.

Speakon connectors arrange their contacts in two concentric rings, with the inner contacts named +1, +2, etc. and the outer contacts connectors (in the four-pole and eight-pole version only) named −1, −2, etc. The phase convention is that positive voltage on the + contact causes air to be pushed away from the speaker.

Speakon connectors are made in two, four and eight-pole configurations. The two-pole line connector will mate with the four-pole panel connector, connecting to +1 and −1; but the reverse combination will not work. The eight-pole connector is physically larger to accommodate the extra poles. The four-pole connector is the most common at least from the availability of ready-made leads, as it allows for things like bi-amping (two of the four connections for the higher-frequency signal, with the other two for the lower-frequency signal) without two separate cables. Similarly, the eight-pole connector could be used for tri-amping (two poles each for low, mid and high frequencies with two unused), or quad-amping (two poles each for high, mid, low and sub).

Another use for the four-pole cable is to carry two channels of amplified signal from an amplifier to a pair of loudspeakers using a 'combiner' Y-lead connected to the two output channels, and a 'splitter' Y-lead to feed the loudspeakers. The 'combiner' and 'splitter' Y-leads are the same: two two-pole connectors on one end, connected to the ±1 and ±2 pins, respectively, of a four-pole line connector at the other end. Some amplifiers and mixer-amplifiers are configured to do this without the need for a 'combiner'.

Also available are 2-pole "combo" receptacles that can also accept 4-pole cables and 1/4″ phone plugs.

In 2019 the manufacturer introduced the STX series which included male line connectors and female panel connectors.

== See also ==
- PowerCon
