= XLR connector =

Electrical connector for audio and lighting

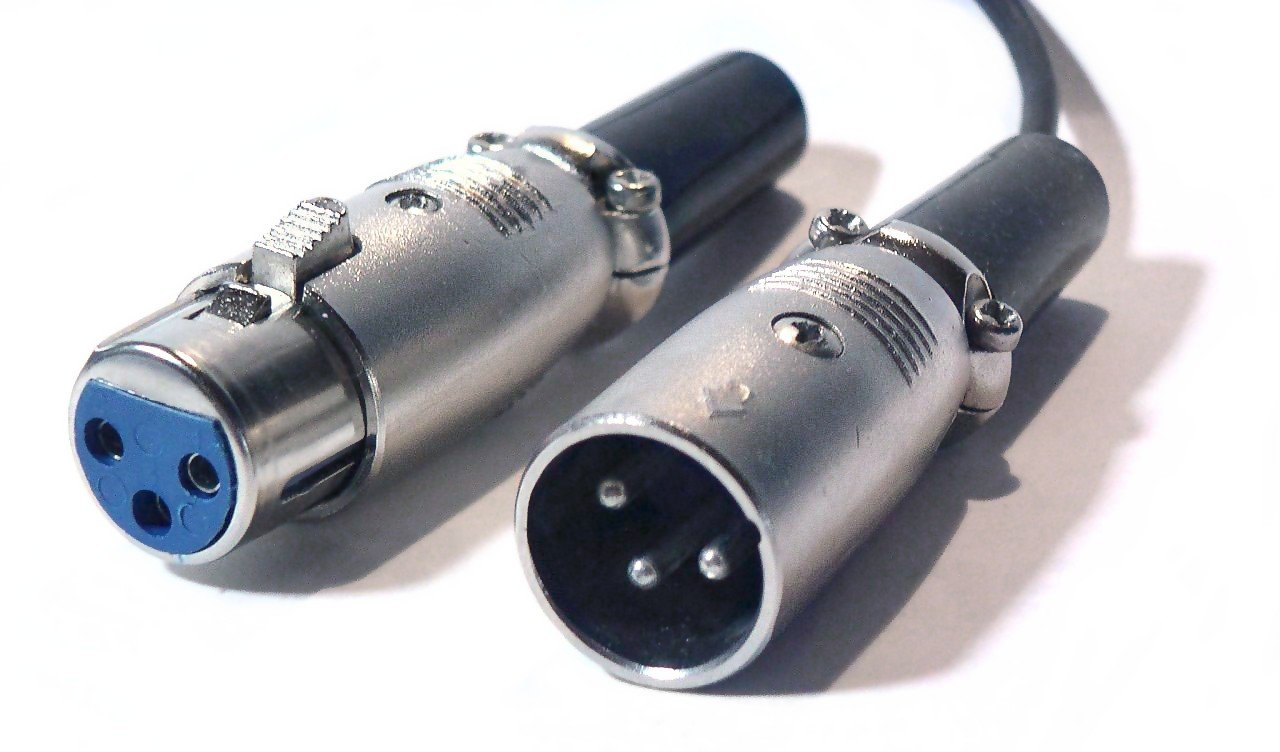
XLR3 cable connectors female (left) and male (right)

The XLR connector (also called a Cannon plug or Cannon connector) is a type of electrical connector primarily used in professional audio, video, and stage lighting equipment. XLR connectors are cylindrical, with three to seven connector pins, and are often employed for analog balanced audio interconnections, AES3 digital audio, portable intercom, DMX512 lighting control, and for low-voltage power supply. XLR connectors are part of the international standard for dimensions, IEC 61076-2-103. The XLR connector resembles the DIN connector, but is larger, more robust and physically incompatible.

The generic term XLR began as a trademark of Cannon Electric, with the letters standing for X model connector with an added latch (L) feature, and resilient (R) neoprene rubber surrounding the female contacts.

== History and manufacturers ==
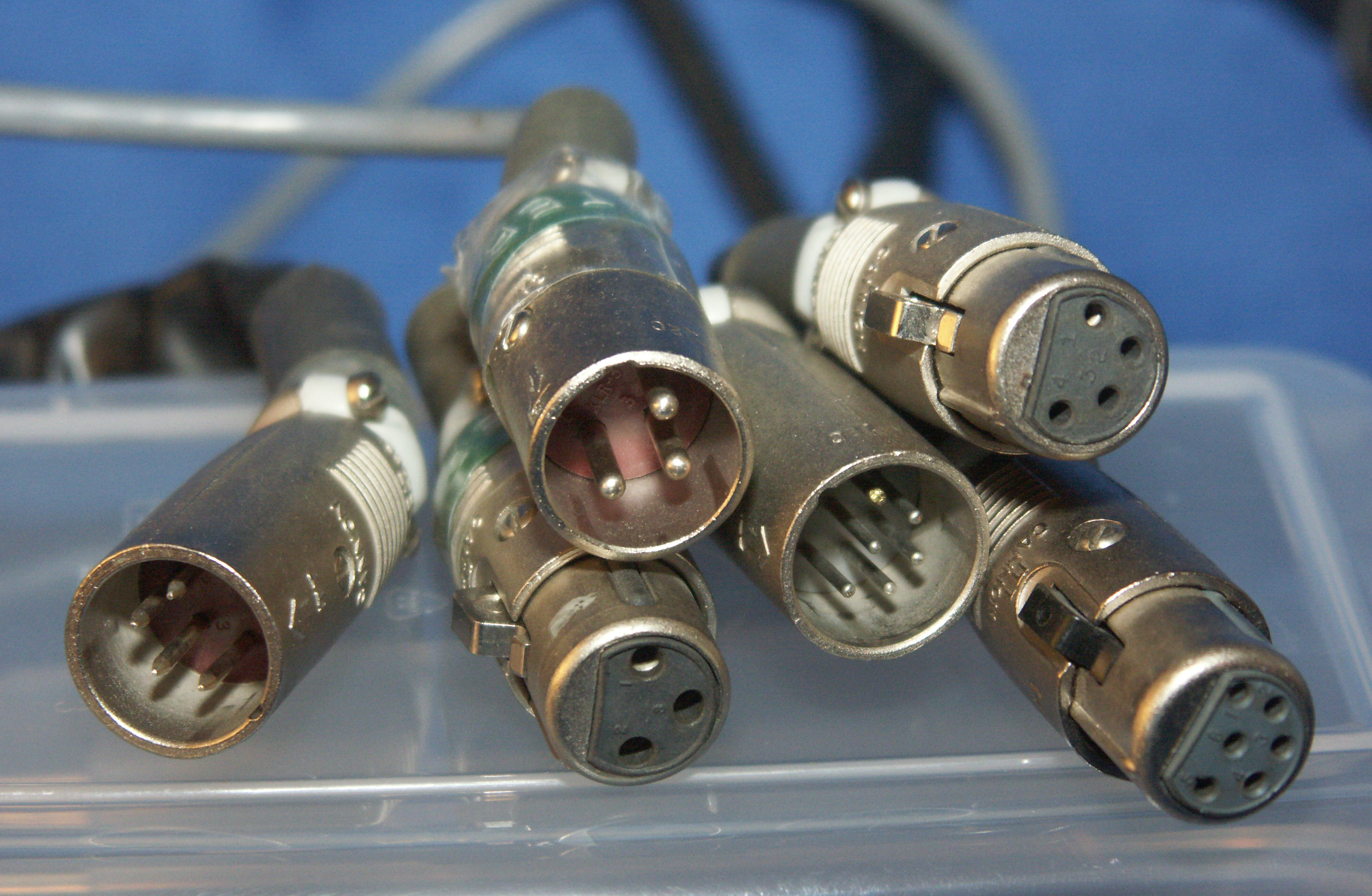
Male and female XLR connectors with different numbers of pins

The XLR connector was invented by James H. Cannon, founder of the Cannon Electric company, Los Angeles, California. The XLR connector originated from the Cannon X series of connectors; by 1950, a latching mechanism was added to the connector, which produced the Cannon XL model of connector, and by 1955, the female connector featured synthetic-rubber insulation polychloroprene (neoprene), identified with the part-number prefix XLR. There was also the XLP series of connectors with hard plastic insulation, but the XLR model name is commonly used for all of the variants.

Originally, the ITT Cannon company manufactured XLR connectors in two locations: Kanagawa, Japan, and Melbourne, Australia. The Australian factory was sold to Alcatel Components in 1992 and then acquired by Amphenol in 1998. Later, the Switchcraft corporation manufactured compatible connectors, followed by the Neutrik company, which made improvements to the connector and produced a second-generation design (the X-series) that had only four parts for the cable connector and eliminated the small screws used in the models of XLR connectors made by Cannon and Switchcraft, as well as in earlier Neutrik series.

== Design ==
XLR connectors are available in male and female versions in both cable and chassis mounting designs, a total of four styles. This is slightly unusual as many other connector designs omit one of the styles (typically a chassis mounting male connector).

The female XLR connectors are designed with a longer metal sleeve to first connect pin 1 (the earth pin) before the other pins make contact when a male XLR connector is inserted. With the ground connection established before the signal lines are connected, the insertion (and removal) of XLR connectors in live equipment is possible without hearing a static pop (as usually happens with, for example, RCA connectors).

The number of pins varies. As of 2016, XLR connectors are available with up to ten pins, and mini XLR connectors with up to eight. XLR connectors from different manufacturers will intermate, with the exception of six-pin models, which are available in two incompatible designs. The older Switchcraft six-pin design adds a center pin to the standard five-pin design, whereas the newer Neutrik design is a different pattern. The Switchcraft six-pin female will accept a standard five-pin male plug, whereas the Neutrik six-pin design will not. Neutrik offers connectors in both six-pin designs.

The terminology for labeling the corresponding members of a pair of mating connectors follows the usual rules for the gender of connectors: a male connector is the one with pins on the smallest element; a female connector has corresponding receptacles. A plug connector enters the socket connector, judged by the largest element. For most other cable types, plugs are male, and sockets are female. (Note: This was not the case for the obsolete mains inlet connector, as that used shrouded pins.) XLR cables are unusual in that, at least in audio applications, all four combinations of male and female plugs and sockets are equally common. XLR connections often employ many free female connectors and panel-mounted male jacks. There is a loose convention for audio work that signals are generated by equipment with male pins and transmitted to those with female receptacles.

== Current patterns and applications ==
=== Three-pin (XLR3) ===
Three-pin XLR connectors are by far the most common style and are an industry standard for balanced audio signals. The great majority of professional microphones use the XLR connector. In previous years, they were used to connect loudspeakers to their amplifiers, for instance, by Trace Elliot in its bass enclosures. The XLR could accept 14 AWG (1.6 mm or 0.063 in) wire with a current-carrying capacity of 15 amps, suitable for most loudspeakers, but they have been superseded by the Speakon connector for professional loudspeakers. The Speakon connector accepts larger wire and carries more current, and it provides a better shield for the contacts, which may carry dangerous voltages when connected to an amplifier.

Three-pin XLR connectors are used to interconnect powered speakers with line-level signals used for PA system applications.

Rechargeable devices exist that use three-pin XLR connectors. These can be found on electric-powered mobility wheelchairs and scooters. The connectors carry from 2 to 10 amps at 24 volts.

An obsolete use for three-pin XLR connectors was for MIDI data on some Octave-Plateau synthesizers, including the Voyetra-8.

The three-pin XLR connector is commonly used for DMX512, on lighting and related control equipment, particularly at the budget / DJ end of the market. However, using three-pin XLR connectors for DMX512 is specifically prohibited by section 7.1.2 of the DMX512 standard. Use of the three-pin XLR in this context firstly presents a risk of damage to the lighting equipment should an audio cable carrying 48-volt phantom power be accidentally connected.

=== Four-pin (XLR4) ===
Four-pin XLR connectors are used in a variety of applications.

They are the standard connector for intercom headsets, such as systems made by Clear-Com and Telex. Two pins are used for the mono headphone signal and two pins for the unbalanced microphone signal.

Another common use is for DC power connections for professional film and video cameras and related equipment. Some desk microphones with LEDs use them. The fourth pin is used to power the LED, indicating that the microphone is on. Other uses for the four-pin XLR include some scrollers (colour-changing devices for stage lighting), AMX analog lighting control (now obsolete) and some pyrotechnic equipment.

A four-pin XLR is used for balanced headphone connections from a balanced amplifier, where there is no common earth between the two channels. Connection diagram: 1. left channel (+) phase; 2. left channel (−) phase; 3. right channel (+) phase; 4. right channel (−) phase.

=== Five-pin (XLR5) ===
Five-pin XLR connectors are the standard for DMX512 digital lighting control.

Other common uses are for dual-element or stereo microphones (two balanced audio signals with a common ground) and stereo intercom headsets (three pins for the stereo headphone signal - left, right, and ground, and two pins for the unbalanced microphone signal).

Additionally, five-pin XLR is commonly used for DC power in audio equipment.

XLR 5 is used in aviation headsets, where it can supply power for active noise cancellation.

=== Six-pin (XLR6) ===
Six-pin XLR connectors are used for dual-channel intercom systems and stage lighting control applications. Another common use is in professional stereo headsets featuring a balanced microphone (headphone left-pin 4, headphone right-pin 5, headphone common-pin 3, mic high-pin 2, mic low-pin 1, mic ground-pin 6).

=== Seven-pin (XLR7) ===
Seven-pin XLR connectors are used to connect some valve (tube) condenser microphones to their power supplies (carrying signal, polarisation voltage, heater and HT).

Used by several models of Le Maitre and Ultratec fog machines for remote control.

An obsolete use for seven-pin XLR connectors was analogue lighting control signals, as well as for wired intercom in broadcast studios, specifically with Ward-Beck intercoms.

=== PDN ===
The loudspeaker Cannon (known as a PDN connector) had blue or white insulation (depending on its gender), and was intended for connections between audio power amplifiers and loudspeakers. These are manufactured by Amphenol (formerly by Alcatel Components and ITT Cannon Australia).

== Obsolete patterns ==
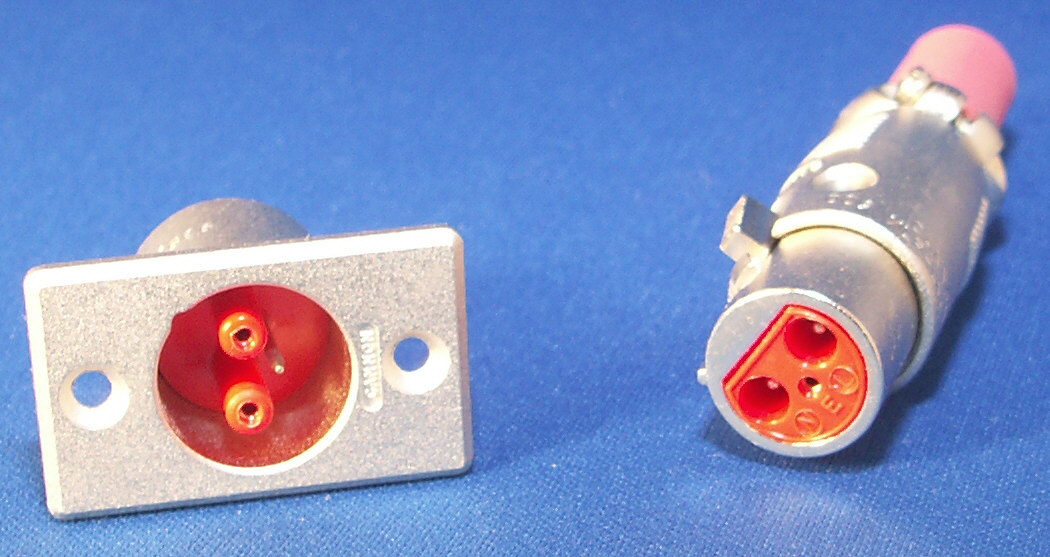
XLR-LNE three-pin male and female connectors, originally used for mains power connections. The connecting pins in the male connector are recessed, and the sockets in the female connectors are shrouded for safety. This example is a panel socket, used as a power input from the male plug, though they were also used in the opposite configuration.

Many other types of connectors using the XLR type shell exist, with various pin configurations. One is the now obsolete three-pin power pattern connector manufactured by ITT Cannon.

The power Cannon (also called the XLR-LNE connector) had shrouded pins and red insulation; it was intended as a mains power plug, an alternative to the IEC 60320 series of connectors, but was only used on a few pieces of equipment.

=== Two-pin (XLR2) ===
A two-pin variant was used as the DC power input socket on Yamaha's 1970s CP-series 'Electric Grand' pianos (CP-60, CP-70 and CP-80).

== Technical usage information ==
This section contains more technical information relating to the most common applications of XLR connectors.

=== Three-pin in audio use ===
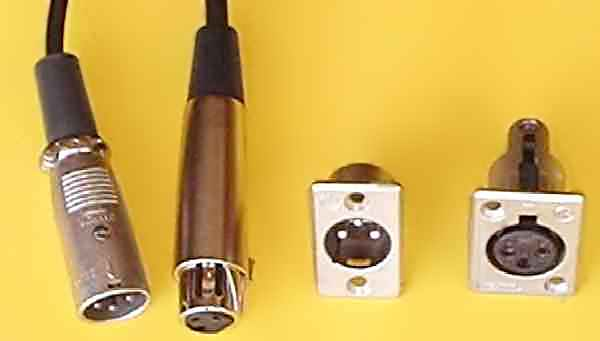
Left to right: Cannon XLR3-12C (line), Switchcraft X3F (line), Neutrik NC3MP panel, Neutrik NC3FP panel

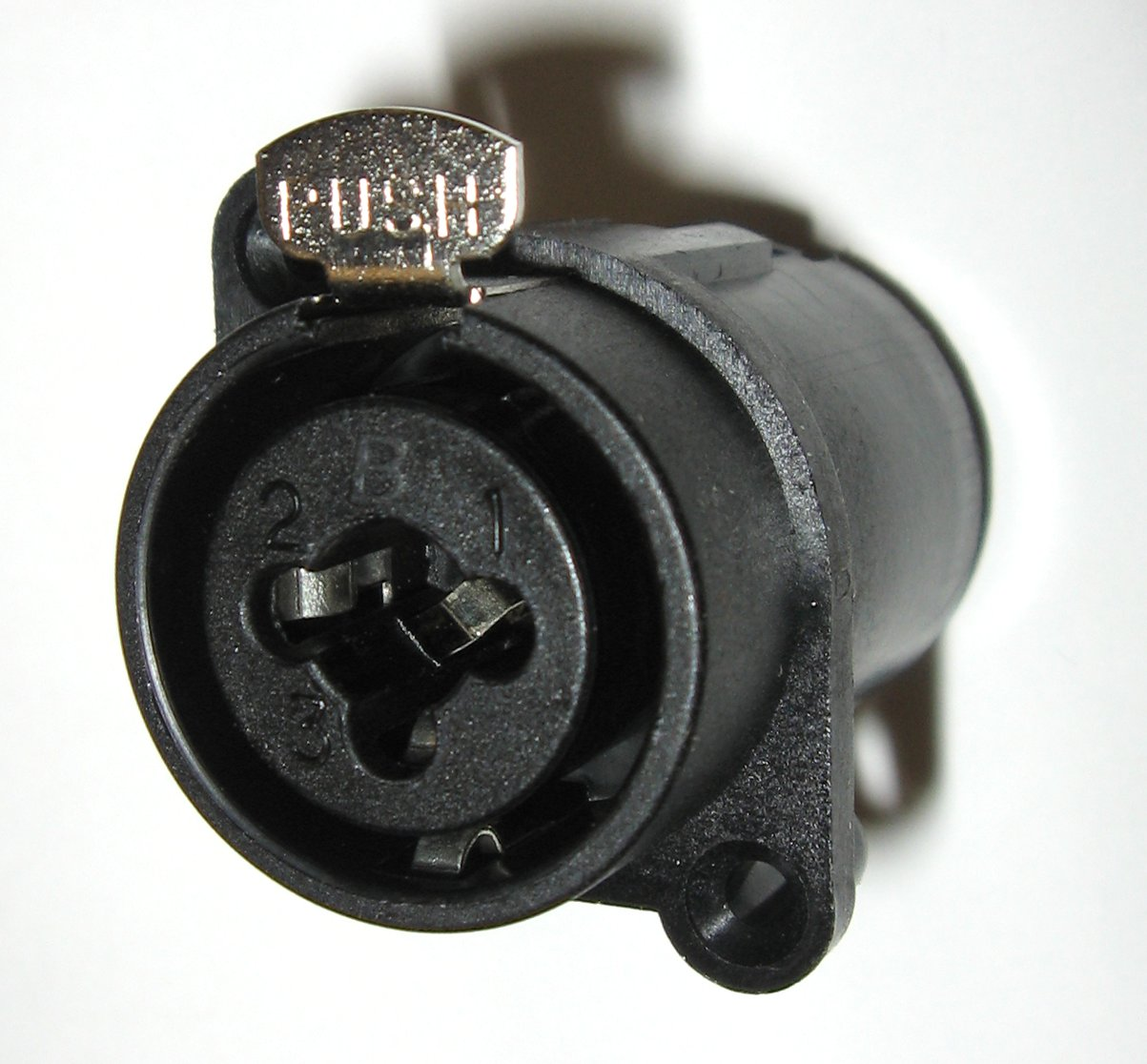
XLR and 1/4 inch TRS phone connector combo jack.

EIA Standard RS-297-A describes the use of the three-pin XLR - known as XLR3 - for balanced audio signal level applications:

| Pin | Function |
|---|---|
| 1 | Chassis ground (cable shield) |
| 2 | Positive polarity terminal for balanced audio circuits (aka "hot") |
| 3 | Negative polarity terminal for balanced circuits (aka "cold") |

Prior to the introduction of this standard, the wiring of pins 2 and 3 varied. The pin 2 "hot" and pin 3 "cold" convention was typically used by European and Japanese equipment manufacturers, but American companies used pin 3 "hot" and pin 2 "cold". This caused problems when interconnecting equipment with unbalanced connections. The pin 3 "hot" convention is now obsolete but is still found on vintage equipment. Pin 1 has always been ground and/or shield if the cable is shielded, and many connectors connect it internally to the connector shell or case.

Although covered in industry technical standards, there is still some disagreement on the best way to handle the use of pin 1 for grounding (earthing). The main controversy is whether the shell of the connector should be connected to pin 1 or the shield, or left floating. AES standards mentioned above recommend that shells of cable-mounted connectors should never be connected to pin 1 or the shield, because inadvertent contact of the shell with another grounded surface while in use can create unwanted current paths for fault current, potentially causing hum and other noise. On the other hand, equipment containing active circuitry should always have pin 1 connected to the conductive enclosure of the equipment as close as possible to the point where the signal enters the enclosure. The argument centers on the radio frequency shielding provided by the shell of the connector, which may be reduced if it is left floating. An alternative solution is to connect the shell to pin 1 and the shield through a small-value capacitor, providing RF shielding but allowing very little audio-frequency current to flow. This capability can be built into a fixed jack or a cable terminated with XLR connectors.

The standard signal flow for audio in XLR connectors is that the output is a male connector and the input is female. In other words, the pins on the plug point in the direction of signal flow. Phantom power, if used, originates from the socket and flows into the plug (the opposite direction to the signal and the normal direction for power circuits). The voltages of microphone and line-level audio signals are not hazardous. The male XLR is usually incorporated in the body of a microphone.

Since equipment often requires an input on a TRS phone jack or an XLR connector, Neutrik and Amphenol offer several models of combination connectors that accept both XLR and 6.5 mm (1/4 in) TS or TRS phone plugs.

=== Four-pin – DC power ===
The most common standard is for pin 1 to be ground and pin 4 to be 12 volts (nominal), with pins 2 and 3 unused. This configuration is used on most professional video cameras and is also common on audio equipment designed for location use. There are other non-standard arrangements, particularly found on older equipment.

=== Four-pin – intercom headset ===
Clear-Com, Telex, RTS and many other production intercom systems use four-pin XLR connectors for attaching monaural intercom headsets or handsets. The standard pinout for four-pin XLR headsets is: Pin 1 = Microphone ground (screen/shield); Pin 2 = Microphone signal ("hot") input; Pin 3 = Headphone ground (return); Pin 4 = Headphone signal ("hot") output.

=== Five-pin – DMX512 and DC power for audio systems ===
XLR5 pinout

The five-pin XLR is the standard connector for DMX512, the most common protocol for controlling professional lighting and related equipment. Three-pin XLR connectors are increasingly common instead. These are electrically compatible with a simple jumpering 1–1, 2–2, 3–3 between them. However, using three-pin XLR connectors for DMX512 is specifically prohibited by section 7.1.2 of the DMX512 standard.

Five-pin XLR is also a common power connector in modular professional audio systems, such as the Automated Processes, Inc.'s (API) Lunchbox format. This format is becoming increasingly popular and five-pin XLR for DC power is used by many third-party module and chassis developers such as BAE Audio and JLM Audio. It is also used by Slate Digital for the VMS1 microphone preamp. Typically the pin configuration is:

- Pin 1: Chassis Ground
- Pin 2: Power Ground
- Pin 3: Positive Voltage (Typically +15 volts or +16 volts)
- Pin 4: Negative Voltage (Typically -15 volts or -16 volts)
- Pin 5: Phantom Power Voltage (Typically +48 volts)

Where XLR connectors are used for DC power, the genders are reversed with respect to their standard use for line-level and mic-level audio. Typically, audio signals on XLR connectors "follow the pin," such that a male connector is an output and a female connector is an input. In most power applications (not just XLR connectors), the female connector is the output and the male connector is the input. This makes accidental contact with live parts less likely. In audio devices, it also prevents accidental application of DC power to signal inputs.

== Other uses ==
Three-pin XLR connectors were once used extensively on loudspeaker cables because, when first introduced, they represented a new standard of ruggedness, and economical alternatives were not readily available. Often, two-conductor loudspeaker cable had three-pin female connectors on both ends, to distinguish it from a three-conductor shielded signal-level cable, which has a female connector at one end and a male at the other. Either pin 2 or 3 was live, depending on the manufacturer, with pin 1 always the 'earth' return. This use has become both obsolete and dangerous to equipment but is still sometimes encountered on older equipment. For example, some loudspeakers have a built-in male connector as an input connector for speaker-level signal. This has been superseded in professional audio applications by the Neutrik Speakon connector.

Three pin XLR connectors are popular power connectors for charging ebike batteries (24V, 36v and 48v).

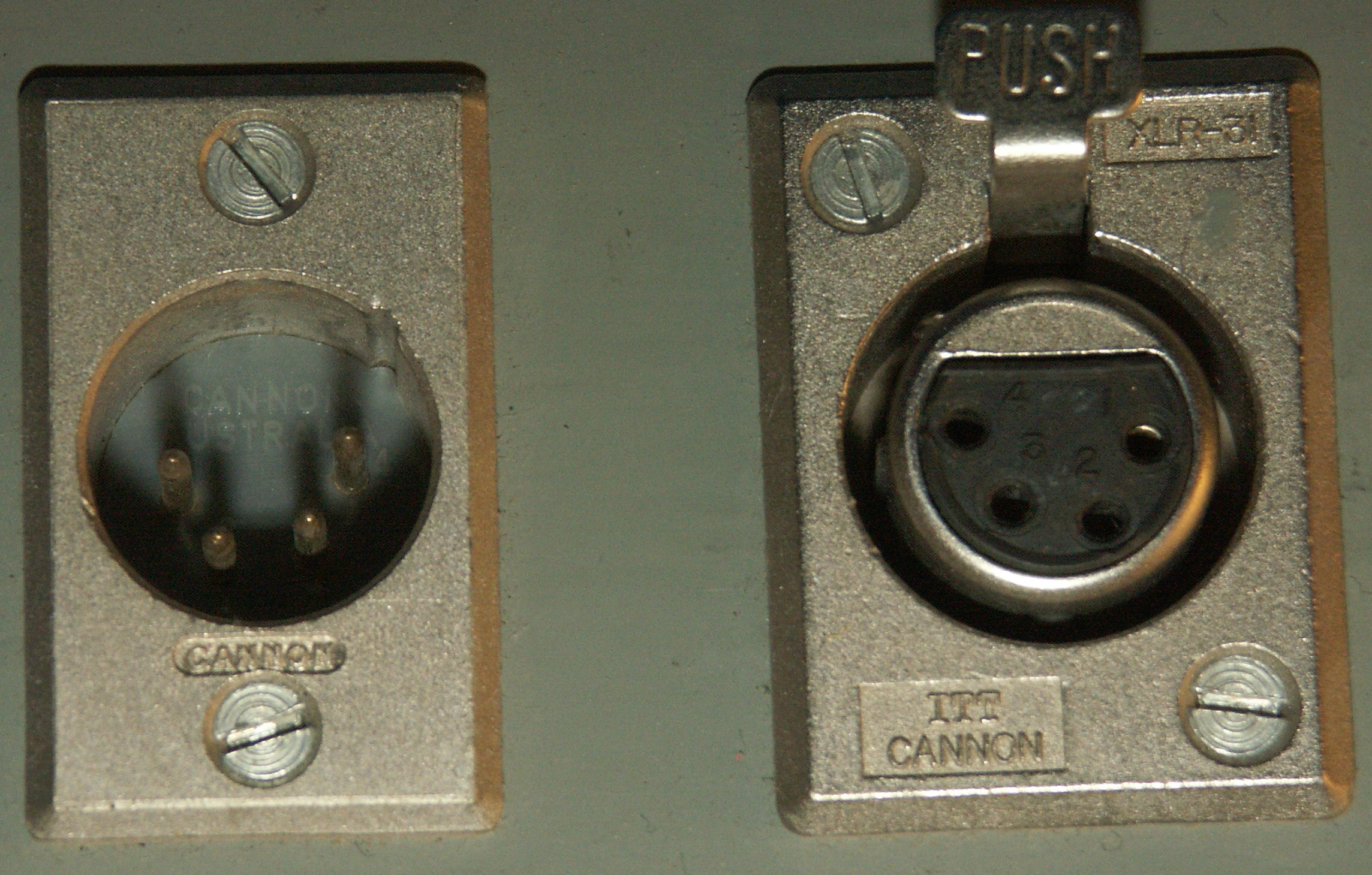
Male and female XLR4 panel connectors

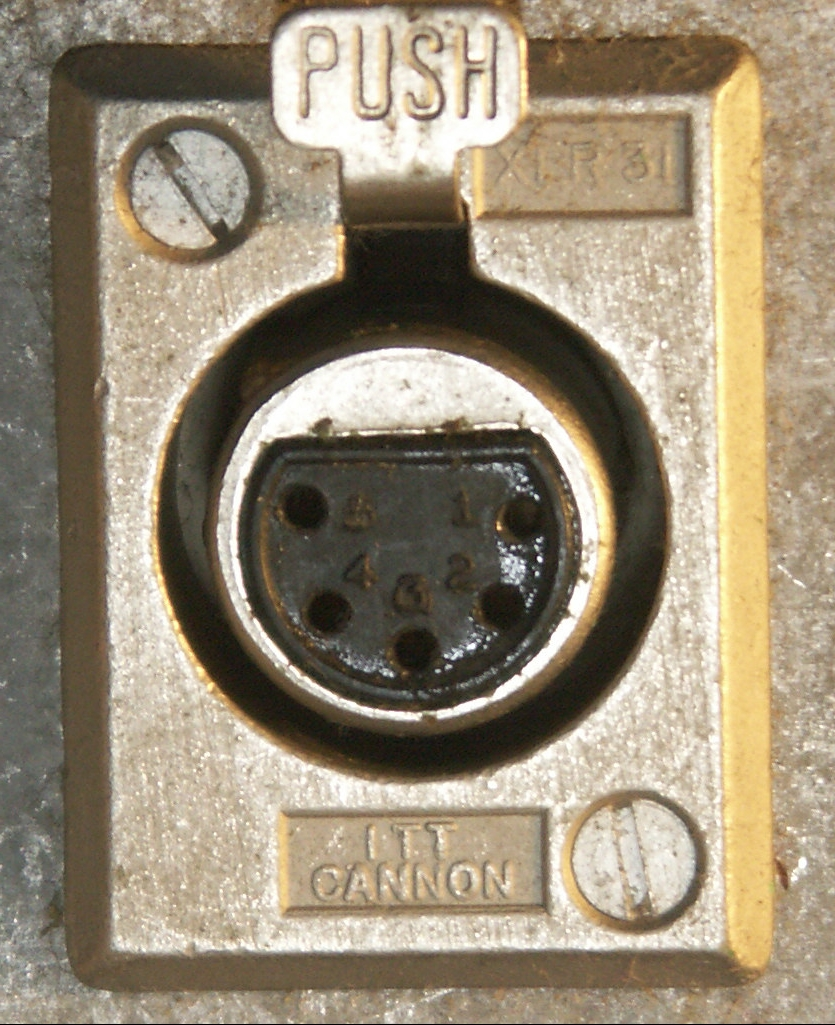
Female XLR5 panel connector

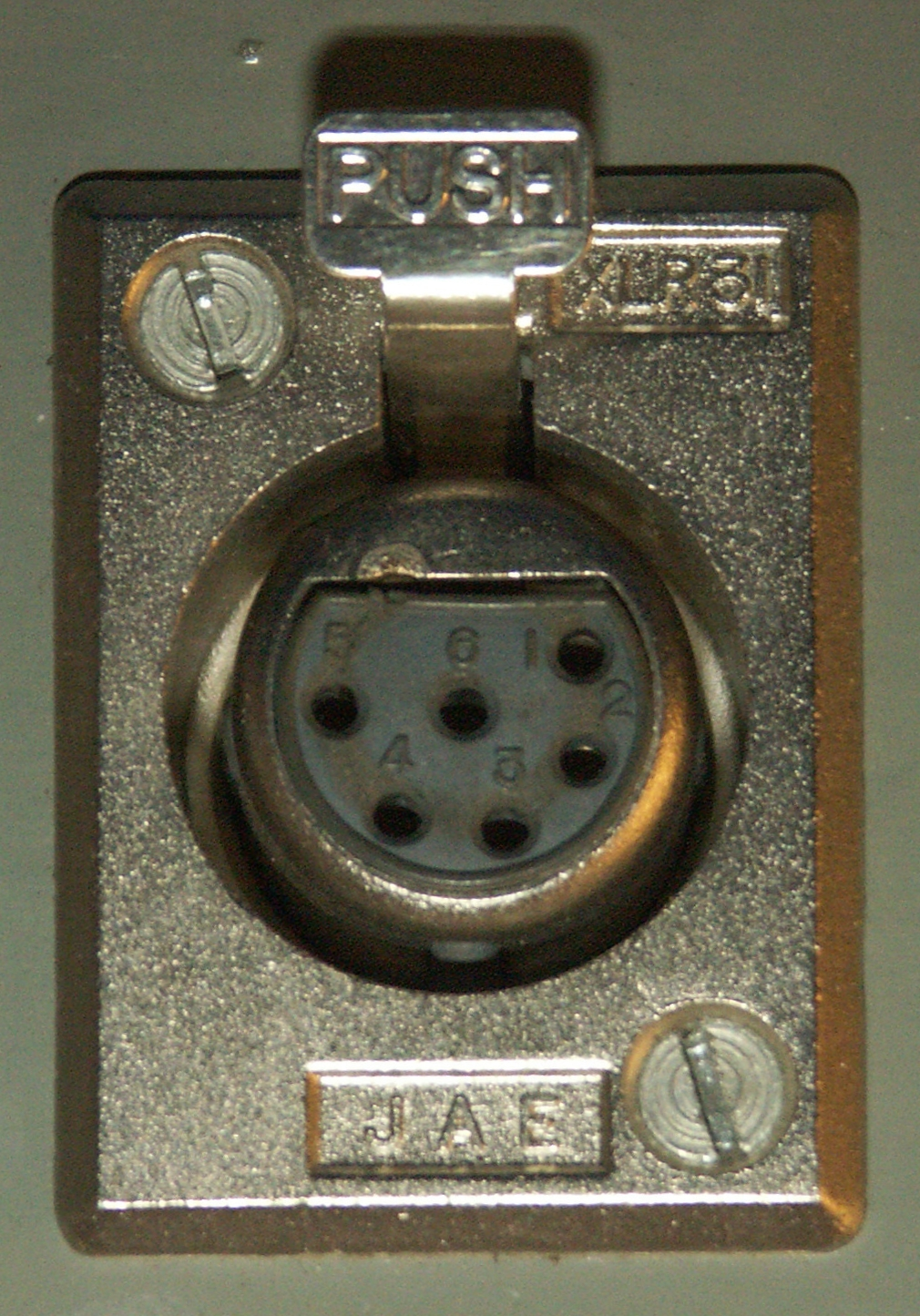
Female XLR6 panel connector

== Phantom power ==
Some microphones, such as condenser microphones, require power. An alternative to battery power is phantom power, which consists of direct current applied equally through the two signal lines of a balanced audio connector, usually a three-pin XLR connector. The supply voltage is referenced to the ground pin of the connector (pin 1 of an XLR), which normally is connected to the cable shield or a ground wire in the cable or both. Phantom power is usually supplied at a nominal 48 volts DC, although lower voltages are permissible and modern microphones will often operate over a wide range.

It is common for modern mixers to have a built-in switch-operated 48-volt power supply that supplies individual or all mic inputs with phantom power, thus eliminating the need for bulky external supplies on individual mics.

== XLD keyed variant ==
The XLD connector is a proposed keyed variant of the XLR connector. The keys prevent accidental mixing of XLR and XLD connectors. XLD plugs and sockets are used mostly in professional audio and video electronics cabling applications.

The XLD connector is proposed by the Audio Engineering Society AES42 digital microphone interface standard.

The connectors are similar to XLR but with an extra coding key and groove that allows control over the intermating of XLD plugs and XLR sockets. A connector with the coding key installed will not mate with a connector that does not have the matching groove. By suitably keying connectors, analog microphones can be protected from damage by the high-current digital phantom power supply provided for digital microphones.

== Mini connectors ==
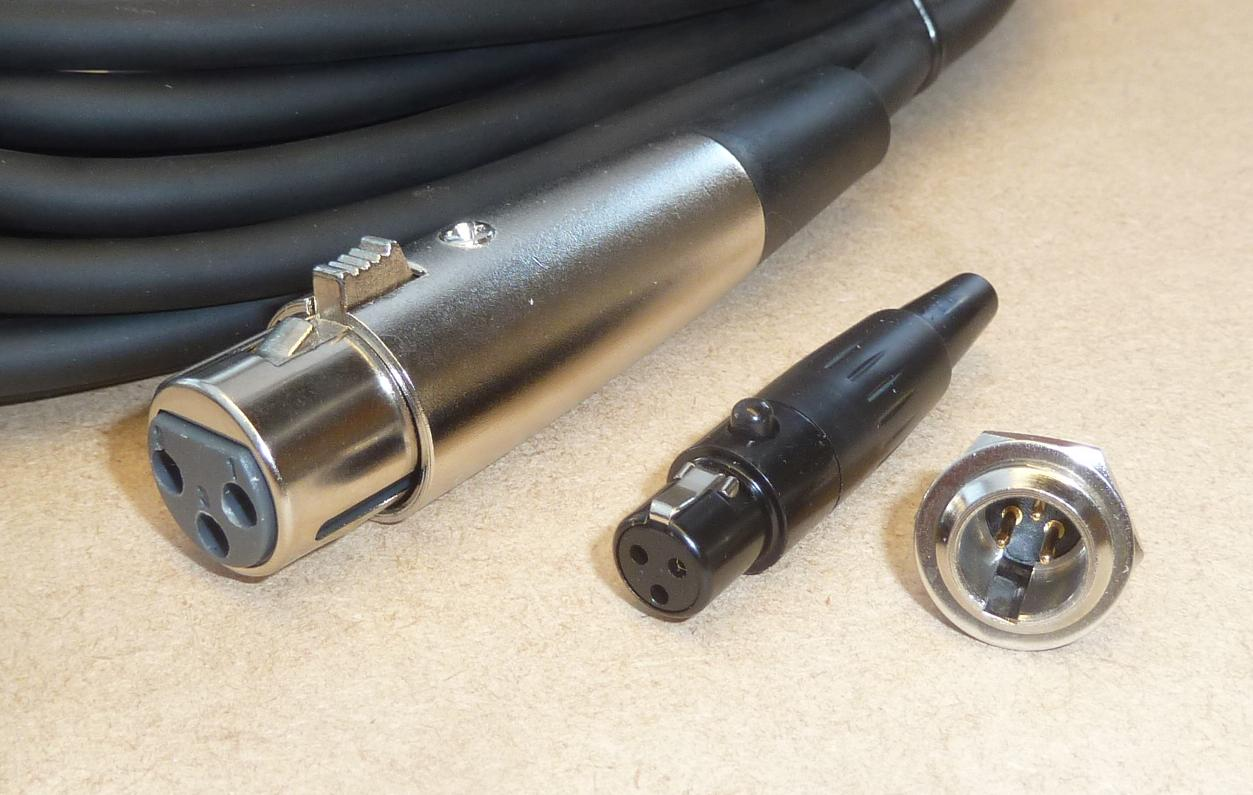
XLR and Mini XLR connectors

The Mini-XLR or Tiny XLR connector, also known as the "Tini-QG" or "TQG", is used on compact items such as UHF wireless microphone beltpacks, some studio and field recording headphones, as well as Audio Technica condenser microphones, but is not in general use on major items such as mixing desks. The Mini XLR Connector was first devised by Switchcraft and is also available from Rean, and various other sources. As of 2014, the Mini XLR connectors do not appear to be covered by any ISO or national standard.

Part numbers vary by manufacturer, number of pins, and mounting method. Switchcraft uses TA3x, TA4x, etc. for inline connectors, and TB3x, TB4x, etc. for panel-mount connectors, while Rean uses RT3x, RT4x, etc.

== See also ==
- Phone connector (audio)
- RCA connector
- RF connector
