= LEMO =

Swiss electronics & cable connector manufacturer

A selection from the LEMO electronic and fiber optic range of connectors

LEMO is an electronic and fiber optic connector manufacturer, based in Écublens, Switzerland. It is known for producing the push-pull connectors. LEMO connectors are used in medical, industrial, audio/visual, telecommunications, military, scientific research and measurement applications. The company, founded in 1946, started as a manufacturer of contacts in noble and rare metals. The company took its name from the company founder, engineer Léon Mouttet.

LEMO has set several connector standards. The 3K.93C connector has been adopted by the American (SMPTE 304M), Japanese (ARIB BTAS-1005B) and European (EBU R100-1999) standards organisations for HDTV fiber links for the broadcast market.

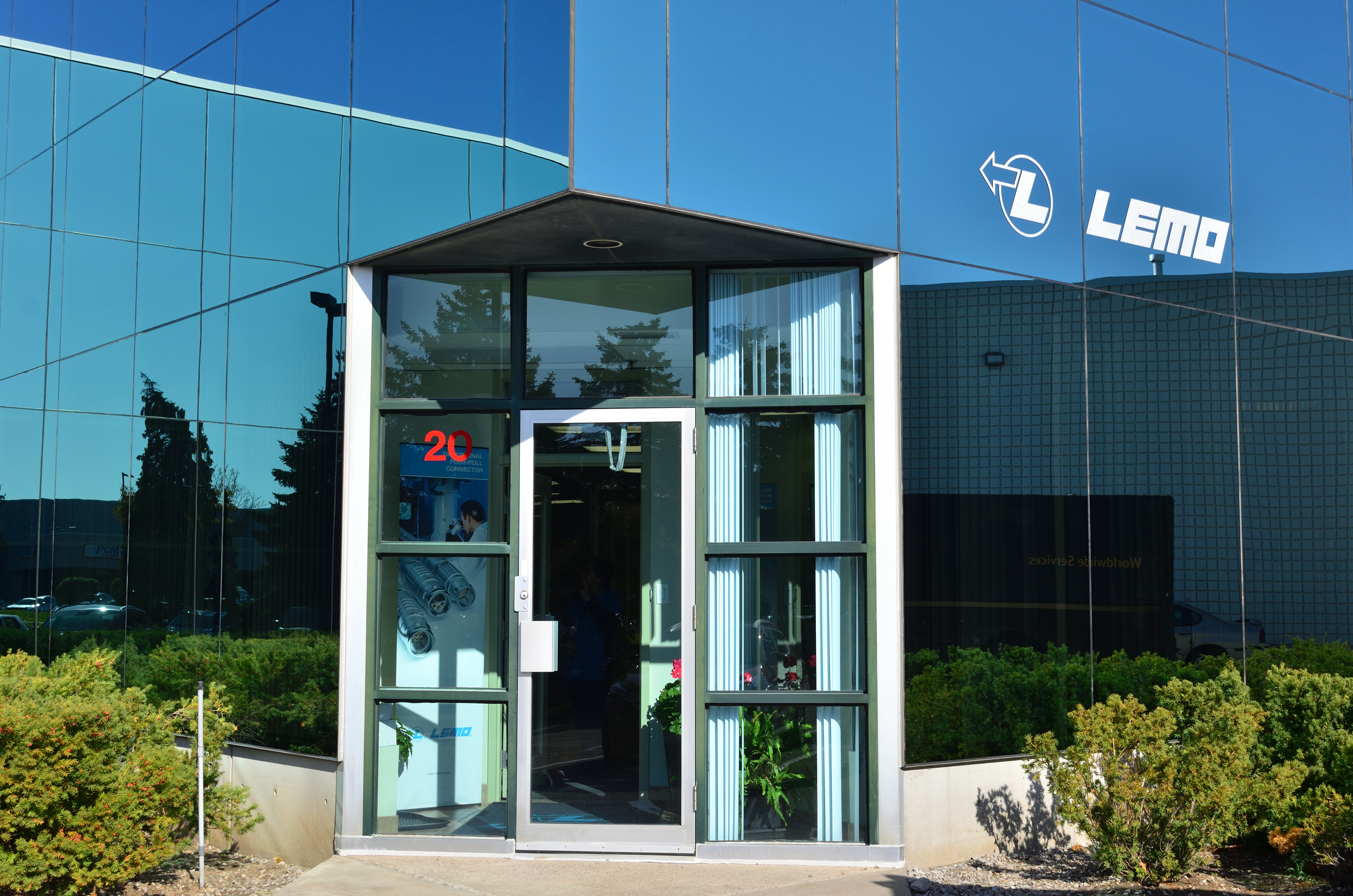
LEMO office in North America

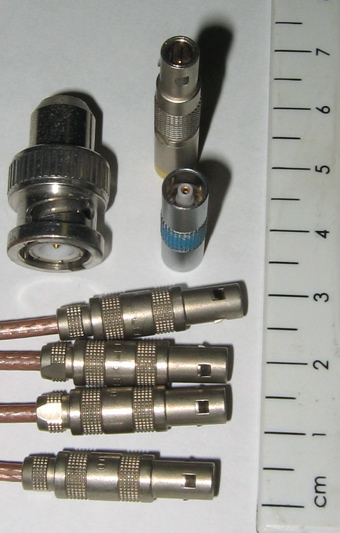
LEMO 00 coaxial connectors on RG316 cable, below a BNC to LEMO adapter, a male-to-male adapter barrel and a 50 Ω terminator (topmost).

While LEMO connectors were generally developed as proprietary designs, the legal status of many of the older designs is not clear. For example, the LEMO website shows a standardisation date of 1970 for the LEMO 00 model. The "chocolate plate" design of the connector's shell grip is, however, trademarked.

LEMO's REDEL connectors are used in medical and aviation environments. Most Cirrus aircraft use REDEL 6-pin connectors.

In July 2014, LEMO acquired Northwire Inc., a US company that makes specialty cables for medical, aerospace, defense, energy, and industrial markets. The acquisition of Northwire allows LEMO to provide a complete cable-connector solution.

LEMO holds two addresses in Japan (Tokyo and Osaka), another one in Singapore, and two in the USA. LEMO also holds offices in Vienna and Budapest.

In 1994, LEMO entered into Chinese market through a distributor. In 2004 LEMO set up a subsidiary company in Shanghai. Besides Shanghai, LEMO China has offices in more than 14 cities, they are as follows: Beijing, Guangzhou, Shenzhen, Tianjin, Changsha, Chengdu, Wuhan, Taiyuan, Harbin, Changchun, Shenyang, Xi'an, Nanjing and Zhengzhou.

In Écublens, one of 3 offices in Switzerland, R&D is performed in a test laboratory with a climatic chamber.

In recognition of its contributions to the television industry, LEMO was honored with a Technology & Engineering Emmy Award in 2020. The award was given for the standardization and commercialization of television broadcast hybrid electrical and fibre-optic camera cable and connector.
