= ITT Interconnect Solutions =

American connector manufacturer

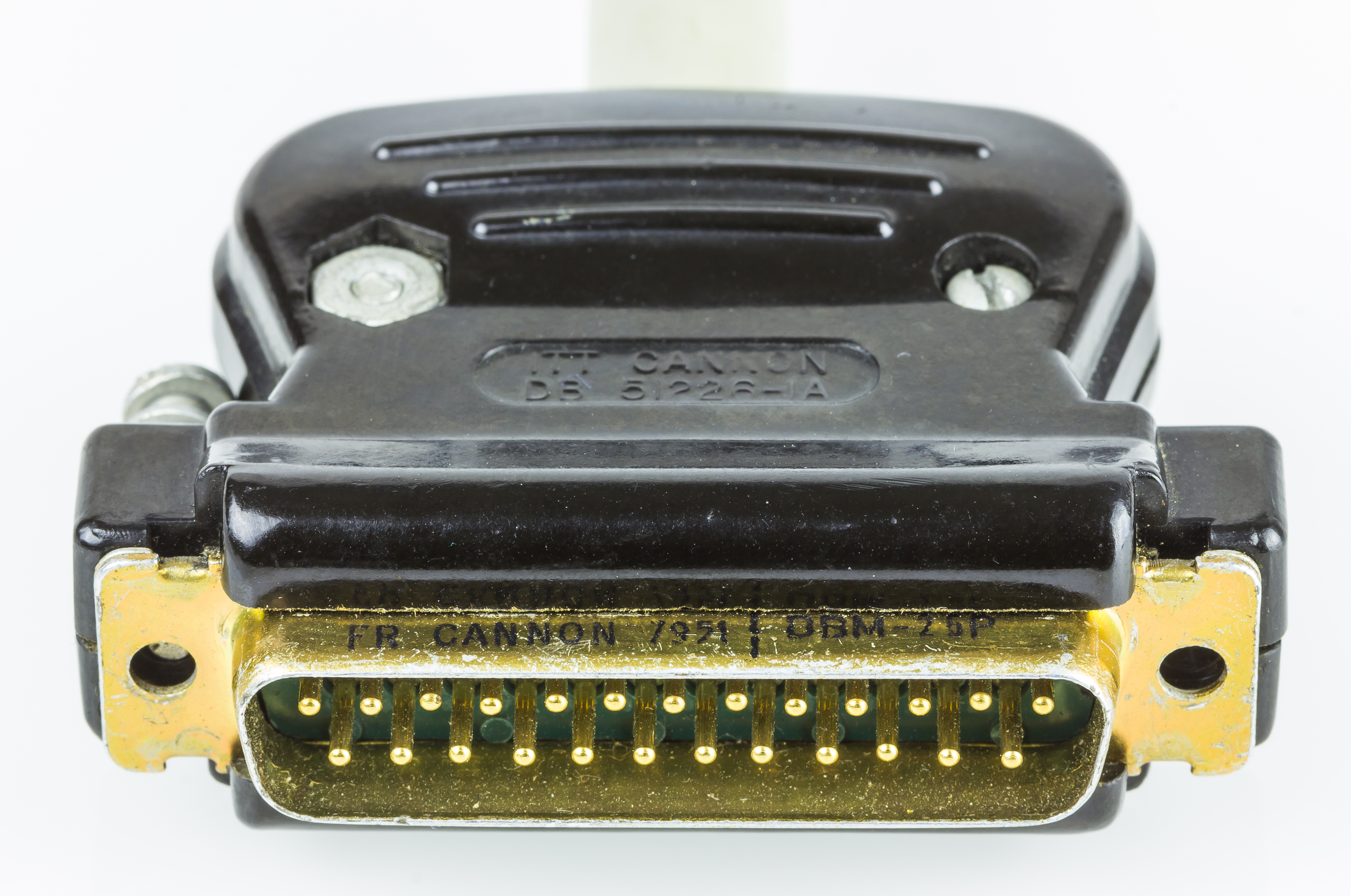
Cannon DBM-25P connector

ITT Interconnect Solutions (ICS), a division of ITT Inc., is a globally diversified connector and connector assembly manufacturing company, headquartered in Irvine, California.

Founded in 1915 as Cannon by James H. Cannon, the company developed some of the first equipment for sound films in the early years of the movie industry, including a synchronous motor drive to remotely operate a motion picture projector together with a phonograph. The first Cannon plug, the M-1 connector, was initially designed as a quick grounding connection for the electrical motor on a portable meat grinder and was adapted for movie sound equipment, enabling the new electrical camera to move freely about while shooting a scene. Cannon's M-1 connector was incorporated into the sound equipment used to make the first talking motion picture, The Jazz Singer. Cannon continued to develop connectors for the entertainment industry, including the P Series audio connectors developed for Paramount Studios, as well as connectors used in the first radio microphones, the first black-and-white television cameras, and the first color television equipment.

== History ==
In the early 1930s, Cannon was contracted by Douglas Aircraft Company to develop a circular connector for use on the DC-1 and on the subsequent DC-2 and DC-3 aircraft platforms. As the aerospace industry evolved, McDonnell Douglas Aircraft – as it became known – remained a key customer for Cannon throughout its existence. During the late 1930s, with World War II on the horizon, Cannon began volume production of multi-contact electrical connectors, which were used by virtually every aircraft builder in the United States. Cannon's AN Series (for "Army/Navy") connector, developed for military aircraft applications, set the standard for modern military connector specifications.

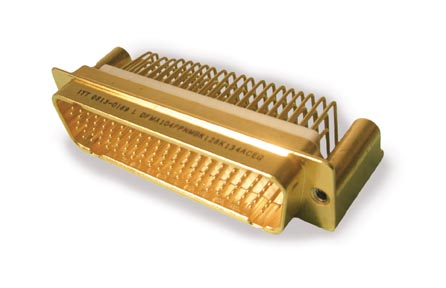
ITT CS800 D-sub connector

In 1952, it invented the industry-standard D-sub connector. These connectors were used for the military/aerospace market, and the company became an international supplier of connectors and interconnection systems with umbilical connectors designed to meet the specialized needs of guided missiles ranging from small rockets to multistage vehicles. ICS's connectors and their derivatives have also had multiple applications in commercial computers and have been implemented by standards such as SCSI, RS-232 and VGA.

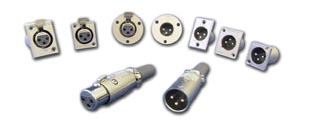
XLR audio connectors

ITT Cannon also developed the XLR connector in the 1950s for military communications applications as well as sound equipment for professional recording studios. Over the years, the XL Series audio connector became a universal solution for both analog and digital connections, and in 2008, the connector was inducted into the TECnology Hall of Fame by the Mix Foundation for Excellence in Audio.

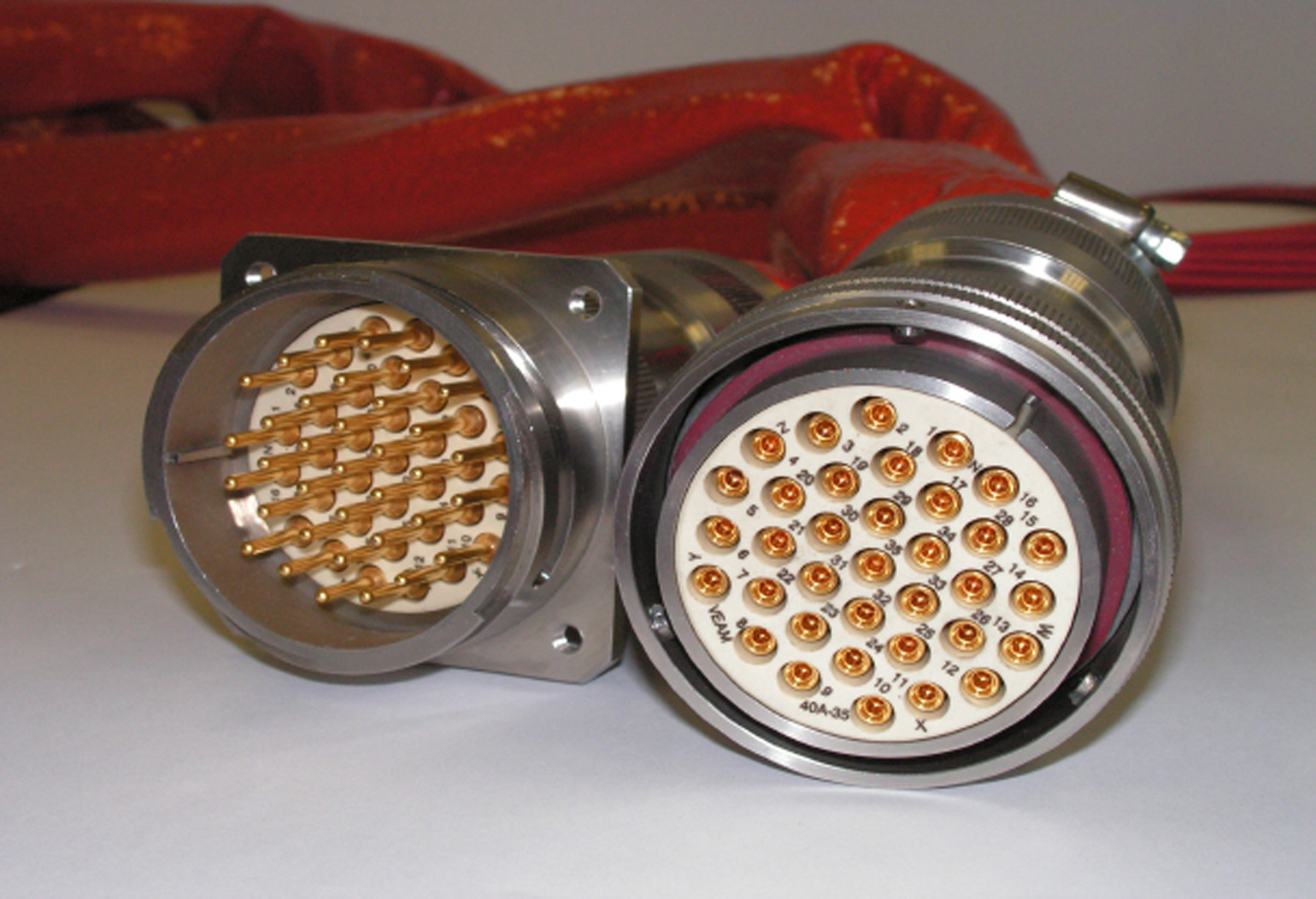
Circular connectors

During this time, the company also became a key connector supplier to the US space program with the development of several specialized connectors for a wide range of aerospace applications, including a special microminiature connector developed for use on space suits. NASA awarded Cannon the Medallion for Distinguished Service for its efforts in the first U.S. crewed lunar landing. The United Space Alliance recently presented ITT Interconnect Solutions with a certificate of appreciation for supporting the shuttle and international space station programs with a variety of circular and fiber optic connectors.

In the automotive and transportation markets, Cannon developed heavy-duty durable connectors capable of withstanding high temperatures and harsh environments, many of which are used in vehicles designed by BMW, Ferrari, General Motors and many others.

In 1963 the company was acquired by ITT.

ITT Cannon entered the medical electronics industry with the development of fiber optic microminiature connectors for diagnostic equipment as well as electronic prostheses to restore eyesight, hearing and other functions. These fiber optic connectors also opened up opportunities in the telecommunications market.

== BIW ==
In 2001, ITT Cannon purchased BIW, a manufacturer of electrical power connectors, cables and harnessing. BIW designed and manufactured the first power feedthrough connectors for electric submersible pumps used in artificial lifts for oil wells, and the company developed the first field-attachable connectors for electric submersible pump power cables.

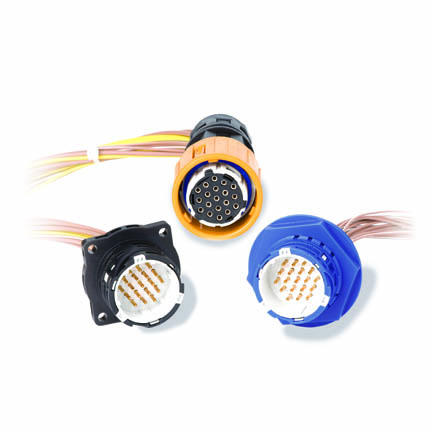
APD Connectors

== VEAM ==
In 2003, ITT Cannon acquired VEAM, a manufacturer of specialized high-reliability DIN rail, multipin, bulkhead sensor and power connectors serving the transportation, military and nuclear markets. As part of ITT Interconnect Solutions, VEAM also offers complete junction box assemblies for mass transit applications.

== ITT Interconnect Solutions ==
In 2007, ITT Cannon changed its name to ITT Interconnect Solutions.

== See also ==
- D-subminiature
- XLR connector
