= HEICO =

Aerospace and electronics company

HEICO Corporation
- Type: Public company
- Traded as: NYSE: HEI; NYSE: HEI.A (Class A); Russell 1000 component
- Industry: Aerospace; Defense; Electronics
- Founded: 1957; 69 years ago as Heinicke Instruments
- Founder: William Heinicke
- Headquarters: Hollywood, Florida, U.S.
- Key people: Eric A. Mendelson; (current co-CEO & co-Chairman); Victor H. Mendelson; (current co-CEO & co-Chairman); Laurans A. Mendelson; (Former CEO & Executive Chairman)
- Revenue: ▲US$3.86 billion (2024)
- Operating income: ▲US$824.5 million (2024)
- Net income: ▲US$514 million (2024)
- Total assets: ▲US$7.6 billion (2024)
- Total equity: ▲US$3.7 billion (2024)
- Number of employees: ▲ c. 10,000 (2024)
- Website: www.heico.com

HEICO Corporation (NYSE: HEI and HEI.A) is an American aerospace and electronics company headquartered in Hollywood, Florida. The company designs, manufactures, and distributes components and systems for a range of industries including aviation, defense, space, medical, and telecommunications. HEICO operates through two main business segments: the Flight Support Group (FSG) and the Electronic Technologies Group (ETG).

== History ==
HEICO was founded in 1957 as Heinicke Instruments Company, a manufacturer of laboratory equipment. In 1974, it entered the aerospace sector with the acquisition of Jet Avion Corporation. The company was renamed HEICO Corporation in 1986 and began focusing on the aerospace aftermarket by designing FAA-approved replacement parts and repair solutions.

HEICO has grown significantly through strategic acquisitions—completing more than 90 acquisitions since the 1990s across aerospace, defense, electronics, and industrial sectors.

== Business segments ==
=== Flight Support Group (FSG) ===
The Flight Support Group designs, engineers, manufactures, repairs, overhauls, and distributes jet engine and aircraft component replacement parts that are approved by regulatory agencies such as the FAA. It serves commercial airlines, cargo carriers, regional and business jet operators, and military aircraft fleets worldwide.

=== Electronic Technologies Group (ETG) ===
The Electronic Technologies Group develops and manufactures electronic, electro-optical, microwave, and infrared components and systems for mission-critical applications. ETG's products are used in aircraft, spacecraft, medical devices, and military hardware.

== Corporate structure and operations ==
HEICO operates a decentralized structure that gives significant autonomy to its subsidiaries. The company emphasizes innovation, cost-effectiveness, and rapid product development across its businesses. Both FSG and ETG maintain independent leadership and business operations to ensure flexibility and focus.

== Leadership ==
- Co-Chairmen of the Board of Directors, Co-Presidents & Co-CEOs: Eric A. Mendelson and Victor H. Mendelson
- Former Chairman and CEO: Laurans A. Mendelson

== Financials ==
- Revenue: US $3.858 billion (Fiscal Year 2024)
- Market Capitalization: approximately US $36–42 billion (June 2025)
- Employees: Approximately 10,000

== Stock information ==
HEICO's shares are traded on the New York Stock Exchange under two classes: Class A (HEI.A) and Common Stock (HEI). As of June 9, 2025, HEI shares reached an all-time high of $303.72.

== Headquarters ==
HEICO Corporation is headquartered at 3000 Taft Street, Hollywood, Florida, 33021, United States.
