= Neutrik =

Liechtenstein audio equipment manufacturer

Neutrik AG
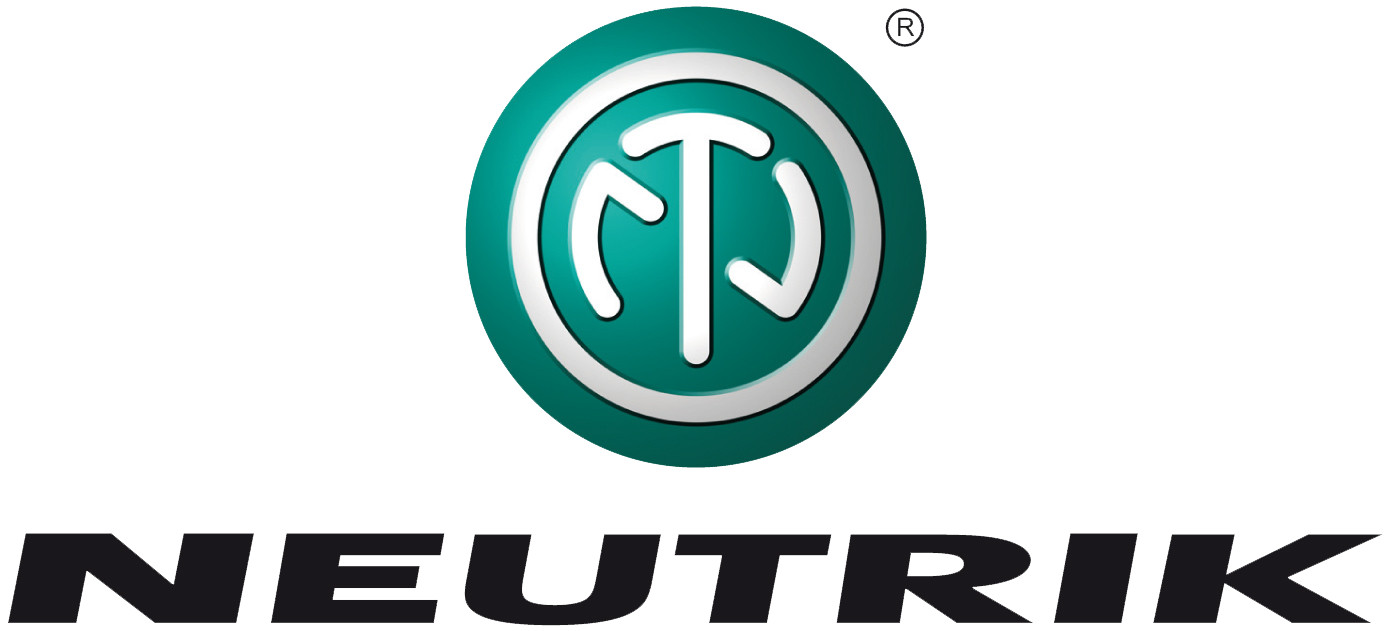
- Type: Private owned company
- Founded: 1975 in Schaan, Principality of Liechtenstein
- Headquarters: Neutrik AG, Schaan, Principality of Liechtenstein
- Number of employees: 1000
- Subsidiaries: Neutrik Zürich AG, Switzerland; Neutrik Vertriebs GmbH, Germany; Neutrik UK Ltd., Great Britain; Neutrik USA Inc., USA; Neutrik France SARL, France; Neutrik Japan Ltd., Japan; Neutrik Hong Kong Ltd., Hong Kong
- Website: www.neutrik.com

Neutrik is a Liechtensteiner company that manufactures connectors used in audio and video recording studios and concert sound systems. Its product range includes XLR-type connectors, speakON connectors, powerCON connectors, etherCON connectors, patch bays, BNC connectors, and special connectors for industrial applications.

Neutrik was founded in 1975 by Bernhard Weingartner, a former AKG engineer. It has subsidiaries (collectively called the Neutrik Group) in the United States, Great Britain, Switzerland, France, Japan, China and Germany and distributors in more than 80 countries. The corporate headquarters is located at Schaan in the Principality of Liechtenstein.

== Main Products ==
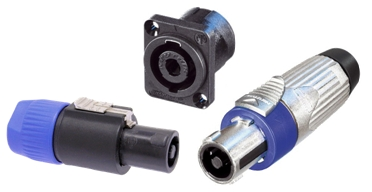
Neutrik SpeakON plug & SpeakON connector.

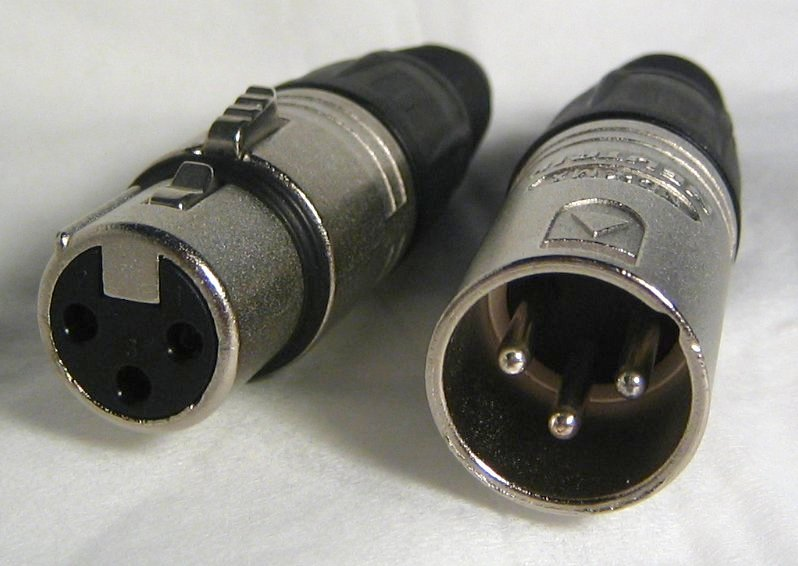
Neutrik NC3FX (left) and NC3MX (right) XLR Cable connectors.
