= IFrogz =

American manufacturer

iFrogz
- Type: Private
- Industry: Consumer electronics
- Founded: March 2006
- Headquarters: Logan, Utah, United States
- Number of locations: 8 office locations (2008)
- Area served: Worldwide
- Key people: Scott Huskinson – CEO and President
- Products: IPod#Accessories, Portable Media Player cases Headphones; Speakers, etc.
- Parent: Zagg, Inc.
- Website: www.ifrogz.com

iFrogz was a Utah-based manufacturer brand of Apple digital audio accessories, with an emphasis on phone cases. A subsidiary of Reminderband, Inc., iFrogz launched its line of iPod cases in March 2006 and has since produced a variety of other media accessories such as iPhone cases, iPad cases, headphones, earbuds, speakers, headphone adapters, carrying cases and bags as well as specialty accessories for kids.

The company sends products worldwide. They have offices in the United States, Singapore, Canada, and France, as well as a logistics and development center in Hong Kong. Apple, Wal-Mart, AT&T, Radio Shack, Staples, and Best Buy are among their large array of retail partners. iFrogz is also the producer of EarPollution, a line of headphones and other audio accessories.

In 2011, iFrogz was acquired by Salt Lake City-based Zagg, Inc.

== History ==
iFrogz was established in March 2006 when the founders of Reminderband, Scott Huskinson and Clay Broadbent, adapted their manufacturing process to create the iFrogz line of iPod cases.

iFrogz logo used from 2006-2013

At the time, iPod cases came in three or four primary colors. With its three-piece iPod case design, iFrogz cases make it possible to customize colors and design elements.

== Products ==
Some of the recent iFrogz products were highlighted on television and radio, including new Swerve case, which combines two cases in one, and their dual AC/12 volt, dual USB charger, customized iPod cases, etc.

A 2010 set of made-to-order custom headphones, including Fallout, NervePipes, and Hype joined their EarPollution line. iFrogz also offers—said to be the first—iPod case for kids the Tadpole, a toddler-friendly silicon case that converts any video iPod to a children's education and portable entertainment device.

iFrogz Audiowrapz case for the 3G iPod nano includes both a protective skin and a set of speakers for iPod Nano.

Several products from the Ear Pollution line were featured on ABC News, Mac Observer and other resources.

In March 2010, iFrogz launched its Comfort Series, including a set of headphones, the CS40s.

In August 2010, iFrogz released its iPhone 4 cases.

In addition to iPod and iPhone cases, iFrogz manufactures skin protection for iPad and has also branched out to create cases for a wider variety of Apple products, as well as protection for the Microsoft Zune.

== See also ==
- iPod
- Speck (company)
