= Phone connector (audio) =

Family of connectors typically used for analog signals

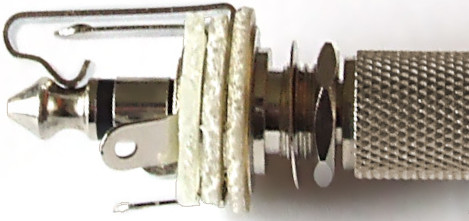
Phone plug mated in a phone socket. The plug's grooved tip is held firmly by the socket's spring tip contact. When not mated, this spring instead connects to the flat switch contact for detecting a plug.

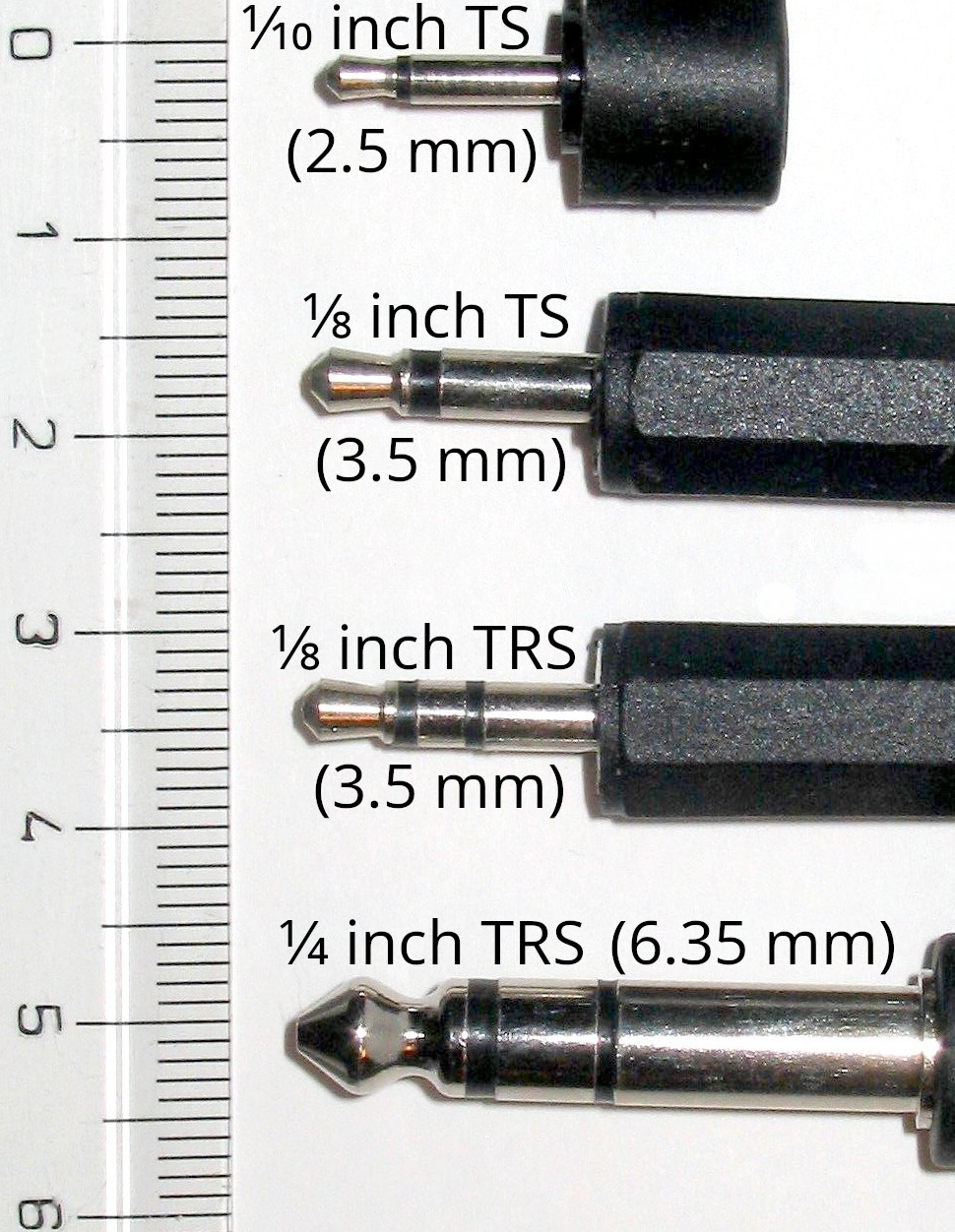
TS and TRS plugs of different sizes

A phone connector is a family of cylindrically shaped electrical connectors primarily for analog audio signals. Invented in the late 19th century for telephone switchboards, the phone connector remains in use for interfacing wired audio equipment, such as headphones, speakers, microphones, mixing consoles, and electronic musical instruments (e.g. electric guitars, keyboards, and effects units). A male connector (a plug), is mated into a female connector (a socket), though other terminology is used.

Plugs have two to five electrical contacts. The tip contact is indented with a groove. The sleeve contact is nearest the (conductive or insulated) handle. Contacts are insulated from each other by a band of non-conductive material. Between the tip and sleeve are zero to three ring contacts. Since phone connectors have many uses, it is common to simply name the connector according to its number of rings:

Abbreviation (full name)	Contacts	Typical uses	Plug appearance
TS (tip sleeve)	2	mono audio	
TRS (tip ring sleeve)	3	stereo audio	
TRS (tip ring sleeve)	3	mono audio (balanced)	
TRS (tip ring sleeve)	3	MIDI	
TRRS (tip ring ring sleeve)	4	stereo headset with mono microphone	
TRRS (tip ring ring sleeve)	4	video with stereo audio	
TRRRS (tip ring ring ring sleeve)	5	stereo audio (balanced)	

The sleeve is usually a common ground reference voltage or return current for signals in the tip and any rings. Thus, the number of transmittable signals is less than the number of contacts.

The outside diameter of the sleeve is 6.35 millimeters (1/4 inch) for full-sized connectors, 3.5 mm (1/8 in) for "mini" connectors, and only 2.5 mm (1/10 in) for "sub-mini" connectors. Rings are typically the same diameter as the sleeve.

== Other terms ==
The 1902 International Library of Technology simply uses jack for the female and plug for the male connector. The 1989 Sound Reinforcement Handbook uses phone jack for the female and phone plug for the male connector. Robert McLeish, who worked at the BBC, uses jack or jack socket for the female and jack plug for the male connector in his 2005 book Radio Production. The American Society of Mechanical Engineers, as of 2007, says the more fixed electrical connector is the jack, while the less fixed connector is the plug, without regard to the gender of the connector contacts. The Institute of Electrical and Electronics Engineers in 1975 also made a standard that was withdrawn in 1997.

The intended application for a phone connector has also resulted in names such as audio jack, headphone jack, stereo plug, microphone jack, aux input, etc. Among audio engineers, the connector may often simply be called a quarter-inch to distinguish it from XLR, another frequently used audio connector. These naming variations are also used for the 3.5 mm connectors, which have been called mini-phone, mini-stereo, mini jack, etc.

RCA connectors are differently shaped, but confusingly are similarly named as phono plugs and phono jacks (or in the UK, phono sockets). 3.5 mm connectors are sometimes—counter to the connector manufacturers' nomenclature—referred to as mini phonos.

Confusion also arises because phone jack and phone plug may sometimes refer to the RJ11 and various older telephone sockets and plugs that connect wired telephones to wall outlets.

== Historical development ==
The original 1/4-inch (6.35 mm) version descends from as early as 1877 in Boston when the first telephone switchboard was installed or 1878, when an early switchboard was used for the first commercial manual telephone exchange in New Haven created by George W. Coy.

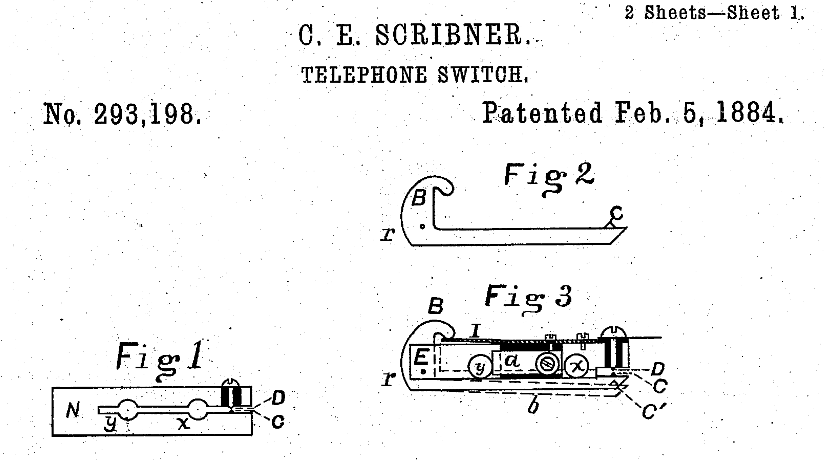
Original "spring-jack switch" in Scribner's patent 293,198 filed on August 23, 1879

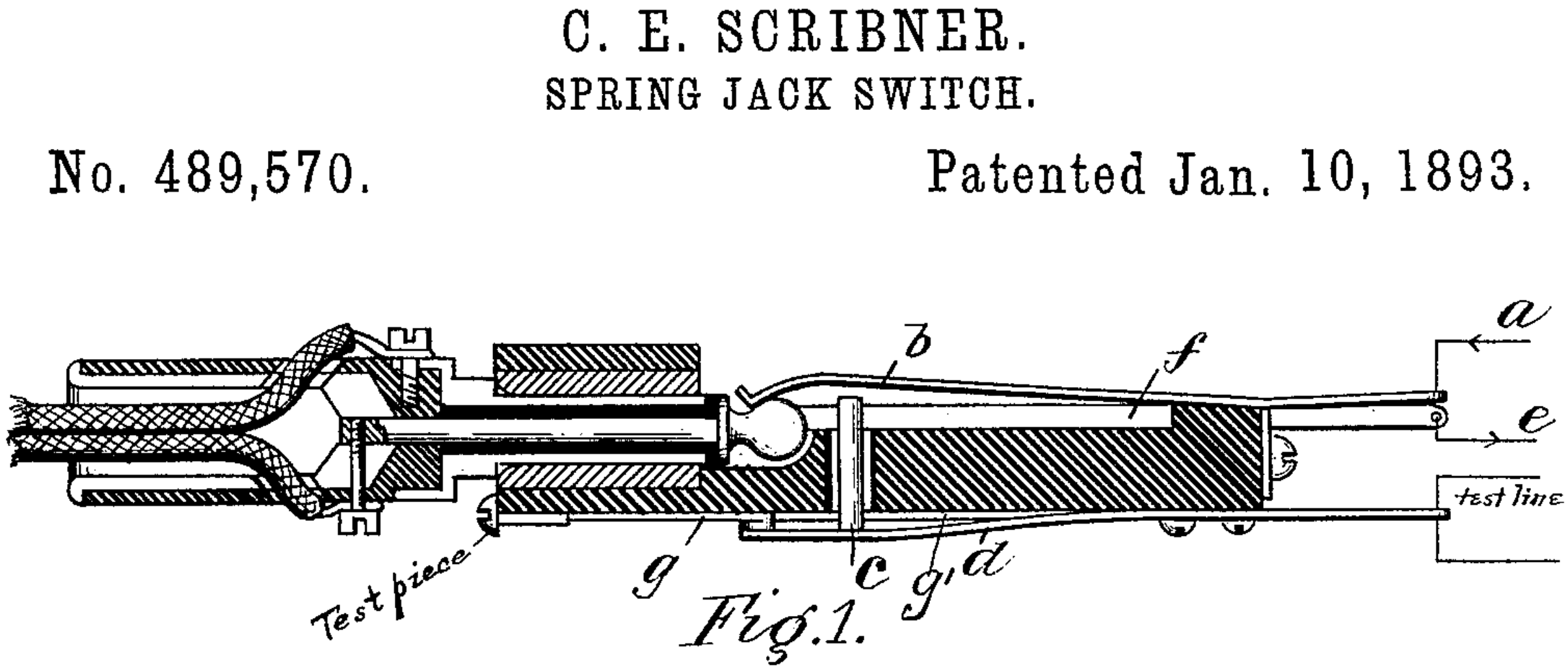
Mated connectors in Scribner's patent 489,570 filed on December 27, 1880

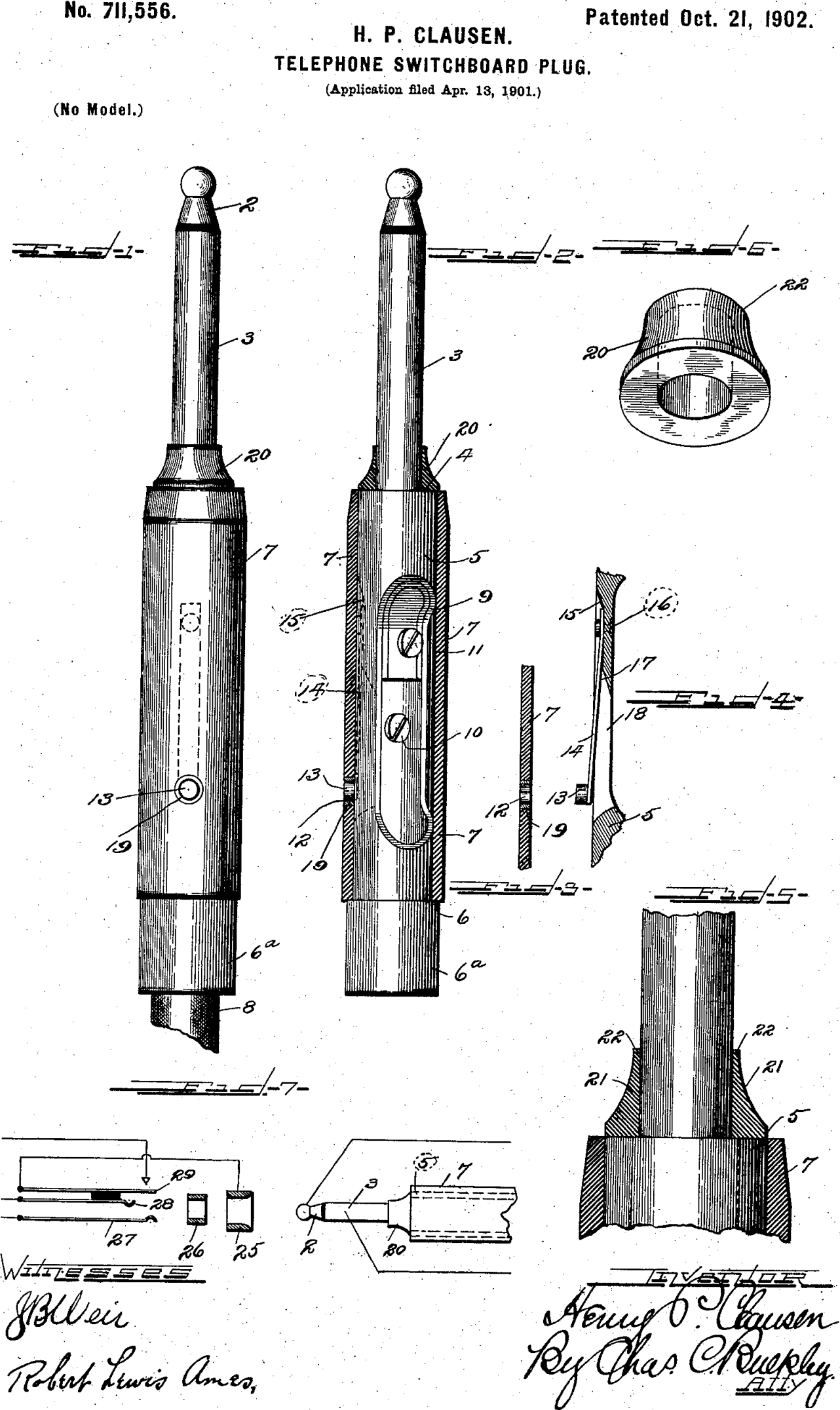
Henry P. Clausen's 1901 patent

Charles E. Scribner filed a patent in 1879 to facilitate switchboard operation using his spring-jack switch. In it, a conductive lever pushed by a spring is normally connected to one contact. But when a cable with a conductive plug is inserted into a hole and makes contact with that lever, the lever pivots and breaks its normal connection. The receptacle was called a jack-knife because of its resemblance to a pocket clasp-knife. This is said to be the origin of calling the receptacle a jack. Scribner filed a patent in 1880 which removes the lever and resembles the modern connector and made improvements to switchboard design in subsequent patents filed in 1882.

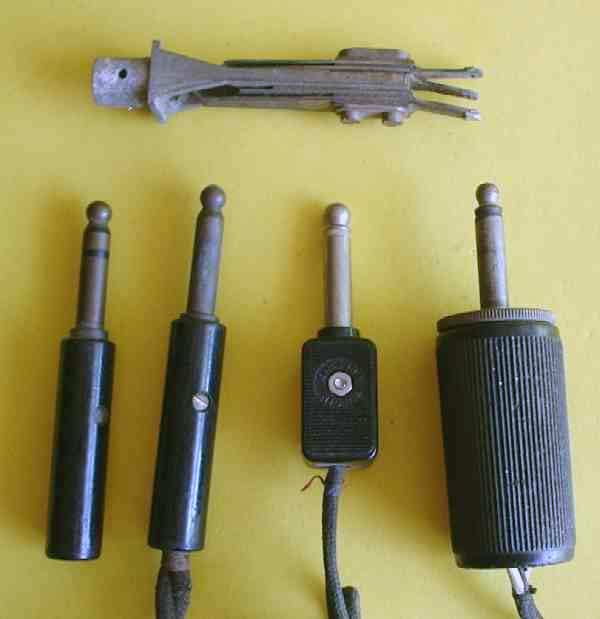
Old connectors. On the top is a TRS socket. Plugs are below. The leftmost is a TRS plug; the rest are TS plugs.

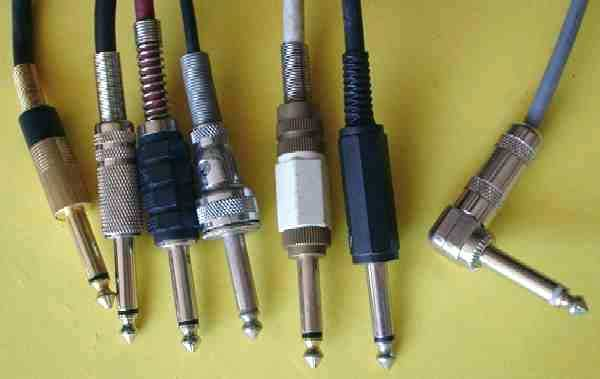
Modern profile 1/4 in TS plugs

Henry P. Clausen filed a patent in 1901 for improved construction of the telephone switchboard-plug with today's 1/4 inch TS form still used on audio equipment.

Western Electric was the manufacturing arm of the Bell System, and thus originated or refined most of the engineering designs, including the telephone jacks and plugs which were later adopted by other industries, including the US military.

By 1907, Western Electric had designed a number of models for different purposes, including:

Code No.	Description
47	2-conductor plugs for use with type 3, 91, 99, 102, 103, 108, and 124 jacks—used for switchboards
85	3-conductor plugs for use with type 77 jacks—used for the operator's head telephone
103	twin 2-conductor plugs for use with type 91, and type 99 jacks—used for the operator's head telephone and chest transmitter (microphone)
109	3-conductor plugs for use with jack 92 on telephone switchboards (with the same basic shape as the modern Bantam plugs)
110	3-conductor plug for use with jacks 49, 117, 118, 140, and 141 on switchboards
112	twin 2-conductor plug for use with jacks 91 and 99—used for the operator's head telephone and chest, with a transmitter cutout key (microphone mute)
116	1-conductor plug for use with cordless jack boxes
126	3-conductor plug for use with type 132 and type 309 jacks on portable street railway sets

By 1950, the two main plug designs were:

- WE-309 (compatible with 3/16-inch jacks, such as 246 jack), for use on high-density jack panels such as the 608A
- WE-310 (compatible with 1/4-inch jacks, such as the 242)

Several modern designs have descended from those earlier versions:

- B-Gauge standard BPO316 (not compatible with EIA RS-453)
- EIA RS-453: Dimensional, Mechanical and Electrical Characteristics Defining Phone Plugs & Jacks standard of 0.206 in (5.2 mm) diameter, also found in IEC 60603-11:1992 Connectors for frequencies below 3 MHz for use with printed boards – Part 11: Detail specification for concentric connectors (dimensions for free connectors and fixed connectors).

=== Military variants ===
U.S. military versions of the Western Electric plugs were initially specified in Amendment No.1, MIL-P-642, and included:

- M642/1-1
- M642/1-2
- M642/2-1
- M642/2-2
- M642/4-1
- M642/4-2
- MIL-P-642/2, also known as PJ-051. (Similar to Western Electric WE-310, and thus not compatible with EIA RS-453)
- MIL-P-642/5A: Plug, Telephone (TYPE PJ-068) and Accessory Screws (1973), and MIL-DTL-642F: Plugs, Telephone, and Accessory Screws (2015), with 0.206 in (5.2 mm) diameter, also known by the earlier Signal Corps PL-68 designation. These are commonly used as the microphone jack for aviation radios, and on Collins S-line and many Drake amateur radios. MIL-DTL-642F states, "This specification covers telephone plugs used in telephone (including telephone switchboard consoles), telegraph, and teletype circuits, and for connecting headsets, handsets, and microphones into communications circuits."

=== Miniature size ===
The 3.5 mm or miniature size was originally designed in the 1950s as two-conductor connectors for earpieces on transistor radios, and remains a standard still used today. This roughly half-sized version of the original, popularized by the Sony EFM-117J radio (released in 1964), is still commonly used in portable applications and has a length of 15 millimeters (0.59 in). The three-conductor version became very popular with its application on the Walkman in 1979, as unlike earlier transistor radios, these devices had no speaker of their own; the usual way to listen to them was to plug in headphones. There is also an EIA standard for 0.141-inch miniature phone jacks.

The 2.5 mm or sub-miniature sizes were similarly popularized on small portable electronics. They often appeared next to a 3.5 mm microphone jack for a remote control on-off switch on early portable tape recorders; the microphone provided with such machines had the on-off switch and used a two-pronged connector with both the 3.5 and 2.5 mm plugs. They were also used for low-voltage DC power input from wall adapters. In the latter role, they were soon replaced by coaxial DC power connectors. 2.5 mm phone jacks have also been used as headset jacks on mobile telephones (see § Mobile devices).

The 1/8 in and 1/10 in sizes, approximately 3.5 mm and 2.5 mm respectively in mm, though those dimensions are only approximations. All sizes are now readily available in two-conductor (unbalanced mono) and three-conductor (balanced mono or unbalanced stereo) versions.

Four-conductor versions of the 3.5 mm plug and jack are used for certain applications. A four-conductor version is often used in compact camcorders and portable media players, providing stereo sound and composite analog video. It is also used for a combination of stereo audio, a microphone, and controlling media playback, calls, volume and/or a virtual assistant on some laptop computers and most mobile phones, and some handheld amateur radio transceivers from Yaesu. Some headphone amplifiers have used it to connect balanced stereo headphones, which require two conductors per audio channel as the channels do not share a common ground.

=== Broadcast usage ===
By the 1940s, broadcast radio stations were using Western Electric Code No. 103 plugs and matching jacks for patching audio throughout studios. This connector was used because of its use in AT&T's Long Line circuits for the distribution of audio programs over the radio networks' leased telephone lines. Because of the large amount of space these patch panels required, the industry began switching to 3-conductor plugs and jacks in the late 1940s, using the WE Type 291 plug with WE type 239 jacks. The type 291 plug was used instead of the standard type 110 switchboard plug because the location of the large bulb shape on this TRS plug would have resulted in both audio signal connections being shorted together for a brief moment while the plug was being inserted and removed. The Type 291 plug avoids this by having a shorter tip.

=== Patch bay connectors ===
Professional audio and the telecommunication industry use a 0.173 in (4.4 mm) diameter plug, associated with trademarked names including Bantam, TT, Tini-Telephone, and Tini-Tel. They are not compatible with standard EIA RS-453/IEC 60603-11 1/4-inch jacks. In addition to a slightly smaller diameter, they have a slightly different geometry. The three-conductor TRS versions are capable of handling balanced signals and are used in professional audio installations. Though unable to handle as much power, and less reliable than a 6.35 mm (1/4 in) jack, Bantam connectors are used for mixing console and outboard patchbays in recording studio and live sound applications, where large numbers of patch points are needed in a limited space. The slightly different shape of Bantam plugs is also less likely to cause shorting as they are plugged in.

=== Less common ===
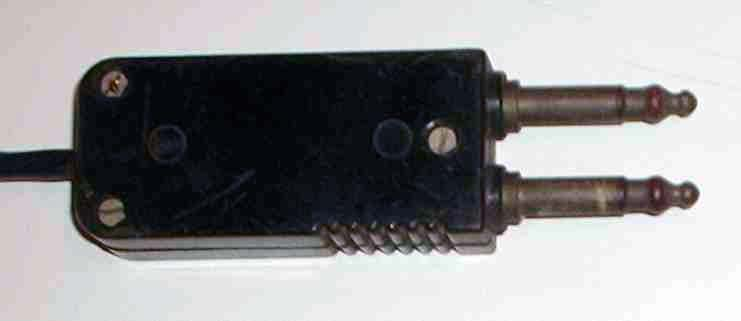
A dual 310 patch cable, two-pin phone plug

A two-pin version, known to the telecom industry as a "310 connector", consists of two 1/4-inch phone plugs at a center spacing of 5/8 inch (16 mm). The socket versions of these can be used with normal phone plugs provided the plug bodies are not too large, but the plug version will only mate with two sockets at 5/8 inches center spacing, or with line sockets, again with sufficiently small bodies. These connectors are still used today in telephone company central offices on "DSX" patch panels for DS1 circuits. A similar type of 3.5 mm connector is often used in the armrests of older aircraft, as part of the on-board in-flight entertainment system. Plugging a stereo plug into one of the two mono jacks typically results in the audio coming into only one ear. Adapters are available.

A short-barreled version of the phone plug was used for 20th-century high-impedance mono headphones, and in particular those used in World War II aircraft. These have become rare. It is physically possible to use a normal plug in a short socket, but a short plug will neither lock into a normal socket nor complete the tip circuit.

Less commonly used sizes, both diameters and lengths, are also available from some manufacturers, and are used when it is desired to restrict the availability of matching connectors, such as 0.210-inch (5.3 mm) inside diameter jacks for fire safety communication in public buildings. (Note: 0.210 inch inside diameter jacks are also found in discontinued Bell & Howell 16 mm projector speakers.)

=== Decline of phone connector sockets in consumer goods ===
While phone connectors remain a standard connector type in some fields, such as desktop computers, musical instrument amplification, and live audio and recording equipment, they have been removed from many smartphones.

Digital audio is now common and may be transmitted via USB sound cards, USB headphones, Bluetooth, display connectors with integrated sound (e.g. DisplayPort and HDMI). Digital devices may also have internal speakers and mics. Thus the phone connector is sometimes considered redundant and a waste of space, particularly on thinner mobile devices. And while low-profile surface-mount sockets waterproofed up to 1 meter exist, removing the socket entirely facilitates waterproofing.

Chinese phone manufacturers were early in not using a phone socket: first with Oppo's Finder in July 2012 (which came packaged with micro-USB headphones and supported Bluetooth headphones), followed by Vivo's X5Max in 2014 and LeEco in April 2016 and Lenovo's Moto Z in September 2016. Apple's September 2016 announcement of the iPhone 7 was initially mocked for removing the socket by other manufacturers like Samsung and Google who eventually followed suit. The socket is also not present in some tablets and thin laptops (e.g. Lenovo Duet Chromebook and Asus Zenbook 13 in 2020).

== Aviation and US military connectors ==
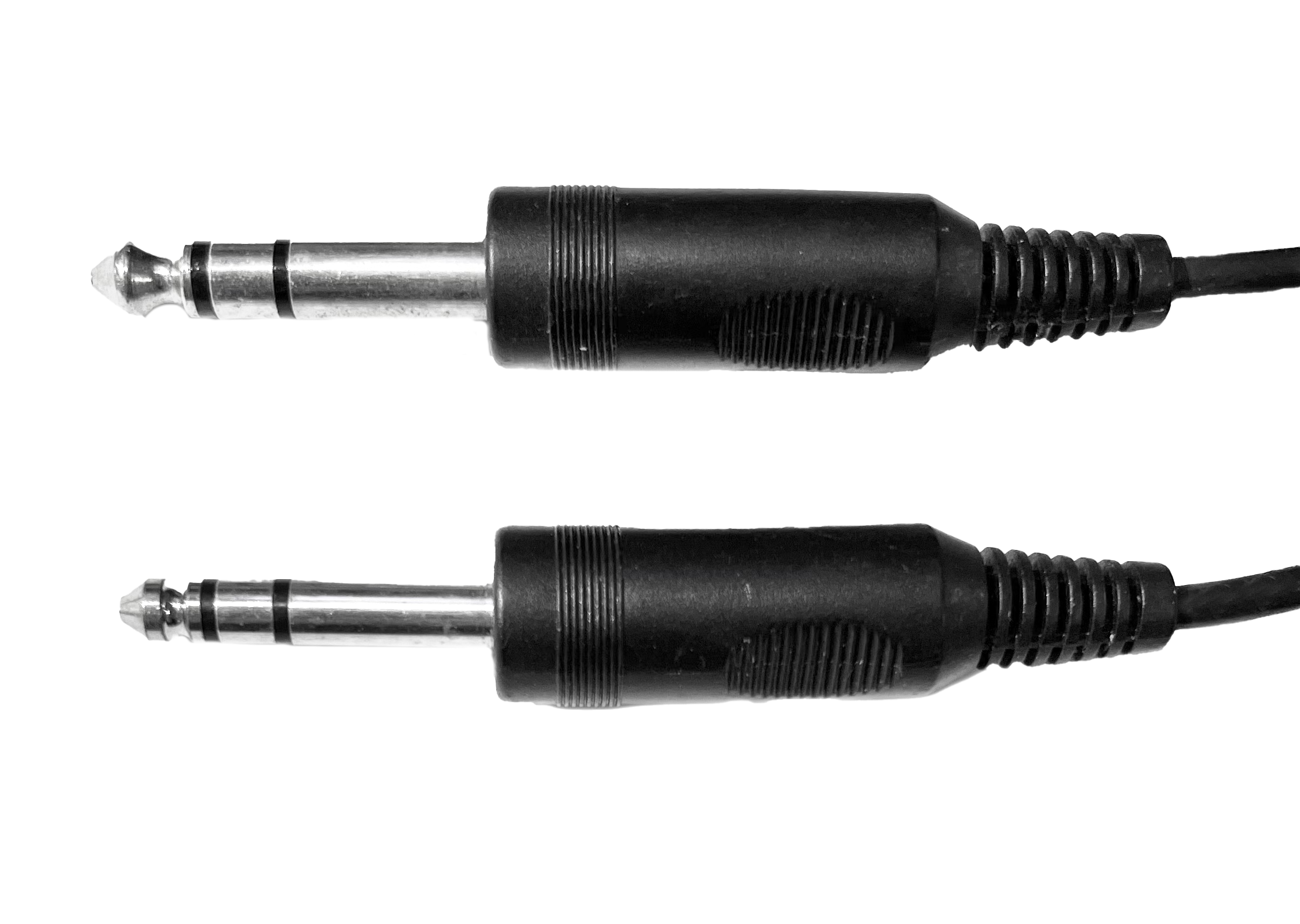
PJ-055 (top) and PJ-068 (bottom) General Aviation Audio Phone Connectors

Aviation plug type U-174/U or Nexus TP120, commonly used on military aircraft and civil helicopters

The US military uses a variety of phone connectors including 9/32-inch (0.281-inch, 7.14 mm) and 1/4-inch (0.25 inch, 6.35 mm) diameter plugs.

Commercial and general aviation (GA) civil aircraft headsets often use a pair of phone connectors. A standard 1/4-inch (6.3 mm) two or three-conductor plug, type PJ-055, is used for headphones. For the microphone, a smaller 3/16-inch (0.206 inch, 5.23 mm) diameter three-conductor plug, type PJ-068, is used.

Military aircraft and civil helicopters have another type termed the U-174/U (Nexus TP-101), also known as U-93A/U (Nexus TP-102) and Nexus TP-120. These are also known as US NATO plugs. These have a 0.281 in (7.1 mm) diameter shaft with four conductors, allowing two for the headphones, and two for the microphone. Also used is the U-384/U (Nexus TP-105), which has the same diameter as the U-174/U but is slightly longer and has five conductors instead of four.

There is a confusingly similar four-conductor British connector, Type 671 (10H/18575), with a slightly larger diameter of 7.57 mm (0.298 in) used for headsets in many UK military aircraft and often referred to as a UK NATO or European NATO connector.

== General use ==
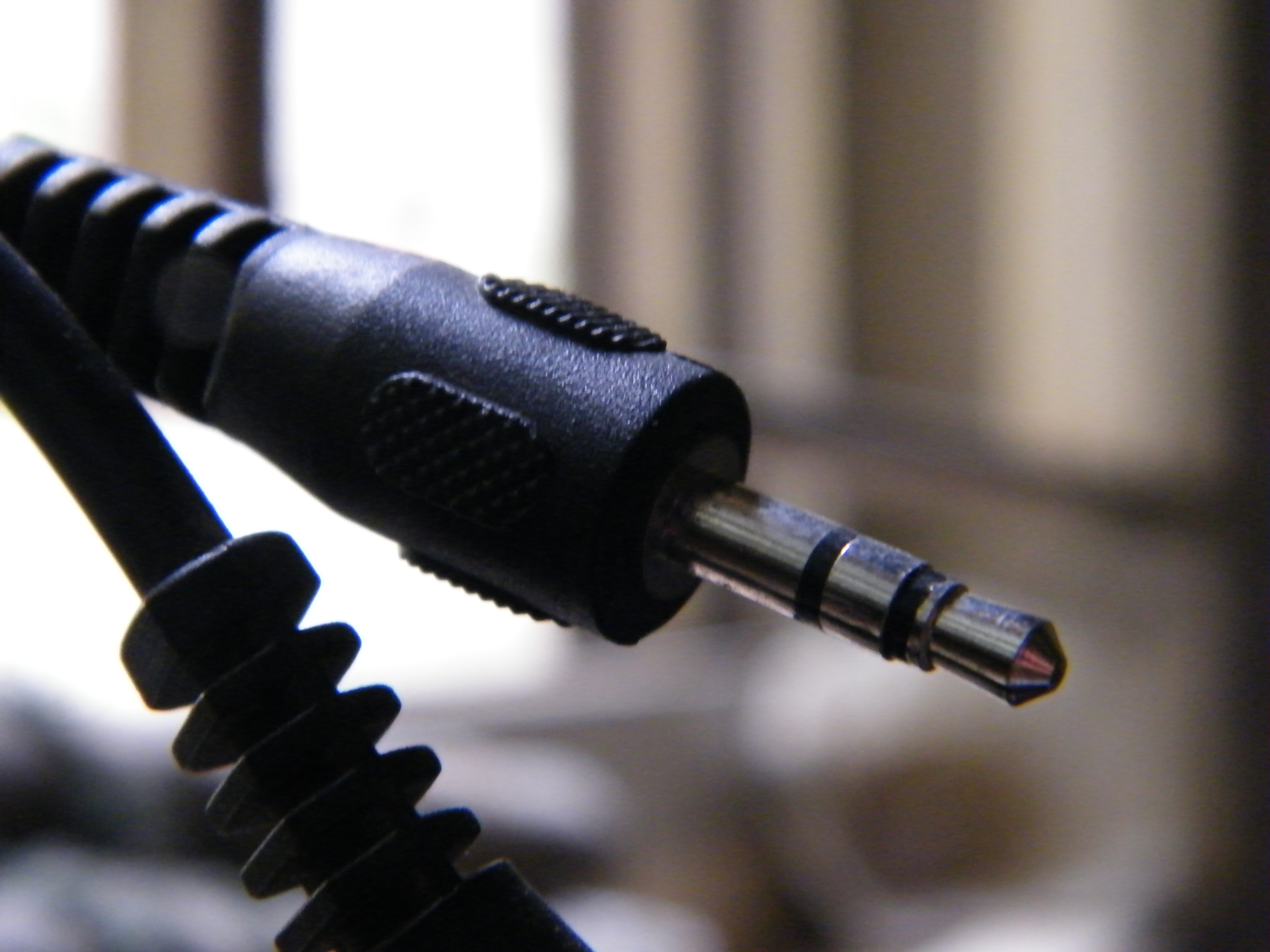
A 3.5 mm phone connector

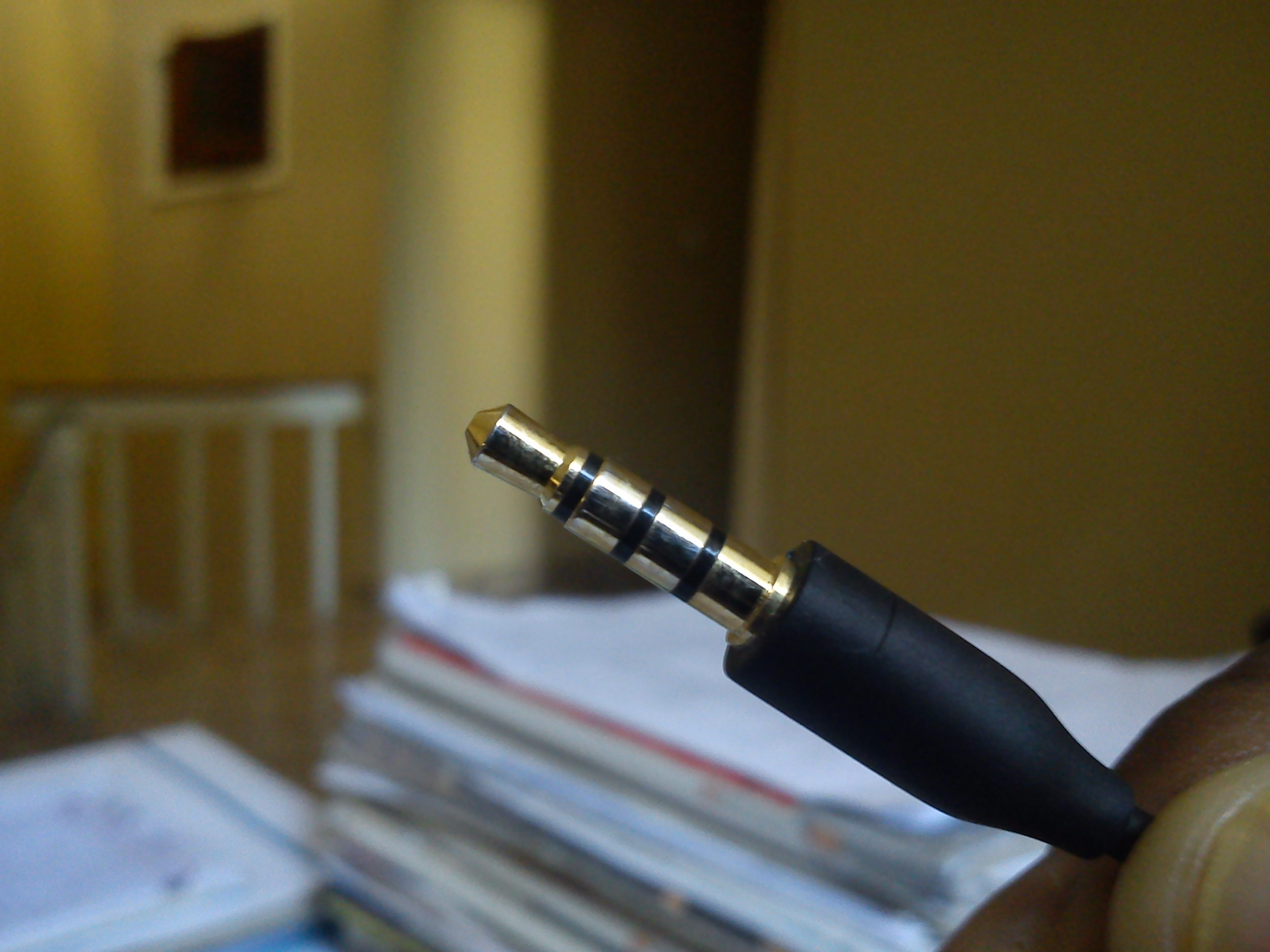
A 3.5 mm 4-conductor TRRS phone connector

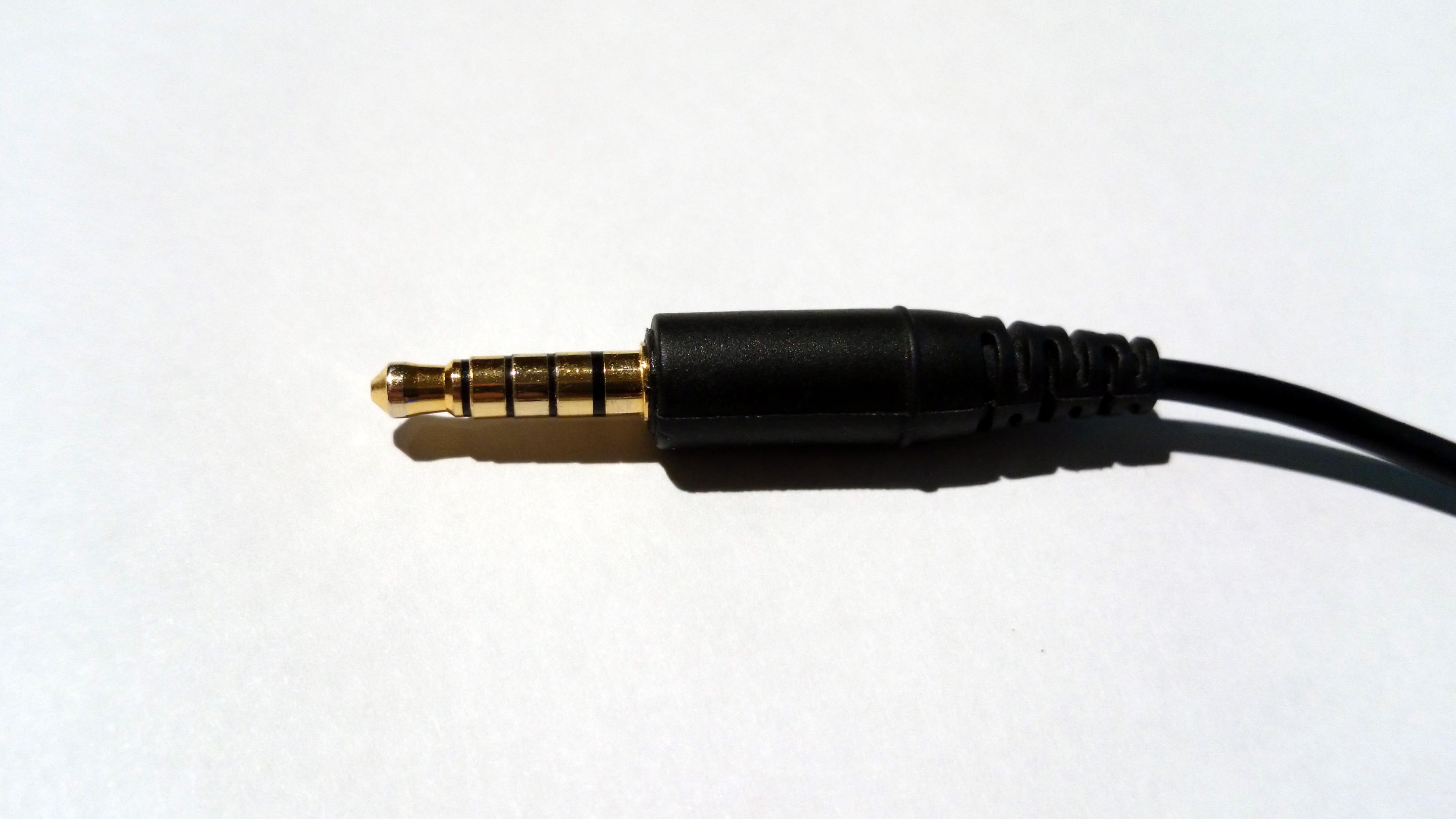
A 3.5 mm 5-conductor TRRRS phone connector

In the most common arrangement, consistent with the original intention of the design, the male plug is connected to a cable, and the female socket is mounted in a piece of equipment. A considerable variety of line plugs and panel sockets is available, including plugs suiting various cable sizes, right-angle plugs, and both plugs and sockets in a variety of price ranges and with current capacities up to 15 amperes for certain heavy-duty 1/4 in versions intended for loudspeaker connections.

Common uses of phone plugs and their matching sockets include:

- Headphone and earphone jacks on a wide range of equipment. 6.35 mm (1/4 in) plugs are common on home and professional audio equipment, while 3.5 mm plugs are nearly universal for portable audio equipment and headphones. 2.5 mm plugs are not as common, but are used on communication equipment such as cordless phones, mobile phones, and two-way radios, especially in the earliest years of the 21st century before the 3.5 mm became standard on mobile phones. The use of headphone jacks in smartphones is declining as of 2020 in favor of USB-C connectors and wireless Bluetooth solutions.
- Consumer electronics devices such as digital cameras, camcorders, and portable DVD players use 3.5 mm connectors for composite video and audio output. Typically, a TRS connection is used for mono unbalanced audio plus video, and a TRRS connection for stereo unbalanced audio plus analog video. Cables designed for this use are often terminated with RCA connectors on the other end. A combined video/audio jack is also present on some computers; several generations of the Raspberry Pi have analog audio and video from the same jack, and Sony also used this style of connection as the TV-out on some models of Vaio laptop.
- Hands-free sets and headsets often use 3.5 mm or 2.5 mm connectors. TRS connectors are used for mono audio out and an unbalanced microphone (with a shared ground). Four-conductor TRRS phone connectors add an additional audio channel for stereo output. TRRS connectors used for this purpose are sometimes interoperable with TRS connectors, depending on how the contacts are used.
- Microphone inputs on tape and cassette recorders, sometimes with remote control switching on the ring, on early, monaural cassette recorders mostly a dual-pin version consisting of a 3.5 mm TS for the microphone and a 2.5 mm TS for remote control which switches the recorder's power supply.
- Musical instruments, such as guitars, digital keyboards and electronic drum kits – along with associated audio equipment such as amplifiers and effects units – generally use 6.35mm TS connectors.
- Patching points (insert points) on a wide range of equipment. An unusual example is the Enigma machine, which featured a plugboard as part of its encryption system.

== Computer sound ==
Color coded soundcard sockets which may be found on the back panel of a personal computer

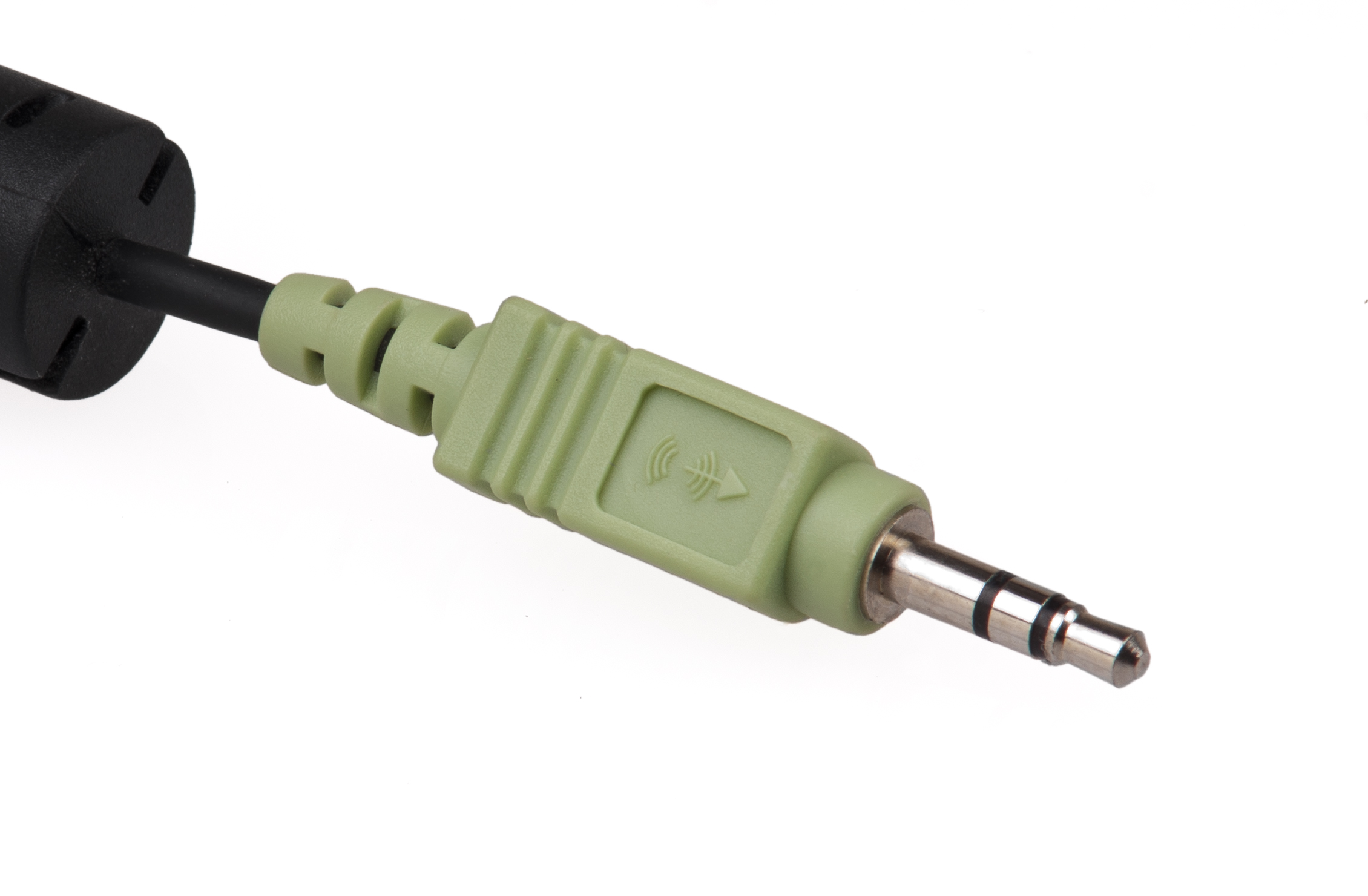
This connector's color indicates it should plug into a computer's line audio out socket.

Any number of 3.5 mm sockets for input and output may be found on personal computers, either from integrated sound hardware common on motherboards or from insertable sound cards. The 1999 PC System Design Guide's color code for 3.5 mm TRS sockets is common, which assigns pink for microphone, light blue for line in, and lime for line level. AC'97 and its 2004 successor Intel High Definition Audio have been widely adopted specifications that, while not mandating physical sockets, do provide specifications for a front panel connector with pin assignments for two ports with jack detection. Front panels commonly have a stereo output socket for headphones and (slightly less commonly) a stereo input socket for a mic. The back panel may have additional sockets, most commonly for line out, mic, line in, and less commonly for multiple surround sound outs. Laptops and tablets tend to have fewer sockets than desktops due to size constraints.

=== Microphone power ===
Some computers include a 3.5 mm TRS socket for mono microphone that delivers a 5 V bias voltage on the ring to power an electret microphone's integrated buffer amplifier, though details depend on the manufacturer. The Apple PlainTalk microphone socket is a historical variant that accepts either a 3.5 mm line input or an elongated 3.5 mm TRS plug whose tip carries the amplifier's power.

=== TRRS headset sockets ===
Some newer computers, especially laptops, have 3.5 mm TRRS headset sockets, which are compatible with phone headsets and may be distinguished by a headset icon instead of the usual headphones or microphone icons. These are particularly used for voice over IP.

=== Surround sound ===
Sound cards that output 5.1 surround sound have three sockets to accommodate six channels: front left and right; surround left and right; and center and subwoofer. 6.1 and 7.1 channel sound cards from Creative Labs, however, use a single three-conductor socket (for the front speakers) and two four-conductor sockets. (Note: Creative's documentation uses the word pole instead of conductor to describe connector contacts.) This is to accommodate rear-center (6.1) or rear left and right (7.1) channels without the need for additional sockets on the sound card.

=== Combined TRS and TOSLINK ===
Some portable computers have a combined 3.5 mm TRS/TOSLINK jack, supporting stereo audio output using either a TRS connector or TOSLINK (stereo or 5.1 Dolby Digital/DTS) digital output using a suitable optical adapter. Most iMac computers have this digital/analog combo output feature as standard, with early MacBooks having two ports, one for analog/digital audio input and the other for output. Support for input was dropped on various later models

== Compatibility for different numbers of rings ==
The original application for the 6.35 mm (1/4 in) phone jack was in manual telephone exchanges. Many different configurations of these phone plugs were used, some accommodating five or more conductors, with several tip profiles. Of these many varieties, only the two-conductor version with a rounded tip profile was compatible between different manufacturers, and this was the design that was at first adopted for use with microphones, electric guitars, headphones, loudspeakers, and other audio equipment.

When a three-conductor version of the 6.35 mm plug was introduced for use with stereo headphones, it was given a sharper tip profile to make it possible to manufacture jacks that would accept only stereo plugs, to avoid short-circuiting the right channel of the amplifier. This attempt has long been abandoned, and now the convention is that all plugs fit all sockets of the same size, regardless of whether they are balanced or unbalanced, mono or stereo. Most 6.35 mm plugs, mono or stereo, now have the profile of the original stereo plug, although a few rounded mono plugs are still produced. The profiles of stereo miniature and sub-miniature plugs have always been identical to the mono plugs of the same size.

The results of this physical compatibility are:

- If a two-conductor plug is inserted into a three-conductor socket, then the socket's ring is shorted to ground, thus any signal sent from that socket's ring is lost. Equipment not designed for this short might, for instance, damage an audio amplifier channel.
- If a three-conductor plug is connected to a two-conductor socket, normally the result is to leave the ring of the plug unconnected. This open circuit is potentially dangerous to equipment using vacuum tubes, but most solid-state devices will tolerate an open condition.

Equipment aware of this possible shorting allows, for instance:

- Mono equipment receiving stereo output will simply use the left (tip) channel as the mono input signal and lose the right (ring) channel of the stereo audio.
- The positive (tip) component of a balanced signal will be received, though without the full benefits of balanced audio, since the signal's negative (ring) component will be lost.

Some devices for an even higher number of rings might possibly be backwards-compatible with an opposite-gendered device with fewer rings, or may cause damage. For example, 3.5 mm TRRS sockets that accept TRRS headsets (stereo headphones with a mic) are often compatible with standard TRS stereo headphones, whereby the contact that expects a mic signal will instead simply become shorted to ground and thus will provide a zero signal. Conversely, those TRRS headsets can plug into TRS sockets, in which case its speakers may still work even though its mic won't work (the mic's signal contact will be disconnected).

Because of a lack of standardization in the past regarding the dimensions (length) given to the ring conductor and the insulating portions on either side of it in 6.35 mm (1/4 in) phone connectors and the width of the conductors in different brands and generations of sockets, there are occasional issues with compatibility between differing brands of plug and socket. This can result in a contact in the socket bridging (shorting) the ring and sleeve contacts on a phone connector.

== Video ==
Different length 3.5 mm TRRS connectors

Equipment requiring video with stereo audio input or output sometimes uses 3.5 mm TRRS connectors. Two incompatible variants exist, of 15 millimetres (0.59 in) and 17 mm (0.67 in) length, and using the wrong variant may either simply not work, or could cause physical damage.

Attempting to fully insert the longer (17 mm) plug into a receptacle designed for the shorter (15 mm) plug may damage the receptacle, and may damage any electronics located immediately behind the receptacle. However, partially inserting the plug will work as the tip/ring/ring distances are the same for both variants.

A shorter plug in a socket designed for the longer connector may not be retained firmly and may result in wrong signal routing or a short circuit inside the equipment (e.g. the plug tip may cause the contacts inside the receptacle – tip/ring 1, etc. – to short together).

The shorter 15 mm TRRS variant is more common and physically compatible with standard 3.5 mm TRS and TS connectors.

== Recording equipment ==
Stereo devices which use "plug-in power": the electret capsules are wired in this way.

Many small video cameras, laptops, recorders and other consumer devices use a 3.5 mm microphone connector for attaching a microphone to the system. These fall into three categories:

- Devices that use an unpowered microphone: usually a cheap dynamic or piezoelectric microphone. The microphone generates its own voltage and needs no power.
- Devices that use a self-powered microphone: usually a condenser microphone with an internal battery-powered amplifier.
- Devices that use a plug-in powered microphone: an electret microphone containing an internal FET amplifier. These provide a good quality signal in a very small microphone. However, the internal FET needs a DC power supply, which is provided as a bias voltage for an internal preamp transistor. Plug-in power is supplied on the same line as the audio signal, using an RC filter. The DC bias voltage supplies the FET amplifier (at a low current), while the capacitor decouples the DC supply from the AC input to the recorder. Typically, V=1.5 V, R=1 kΩ, C=47 μF. If a recorder provides plug-in power, and the microphone does not need it, everything will usually work well. In the converse case (recorder provides no power; microphone needs power), no sound will be recorded.

== Mobile devices ==
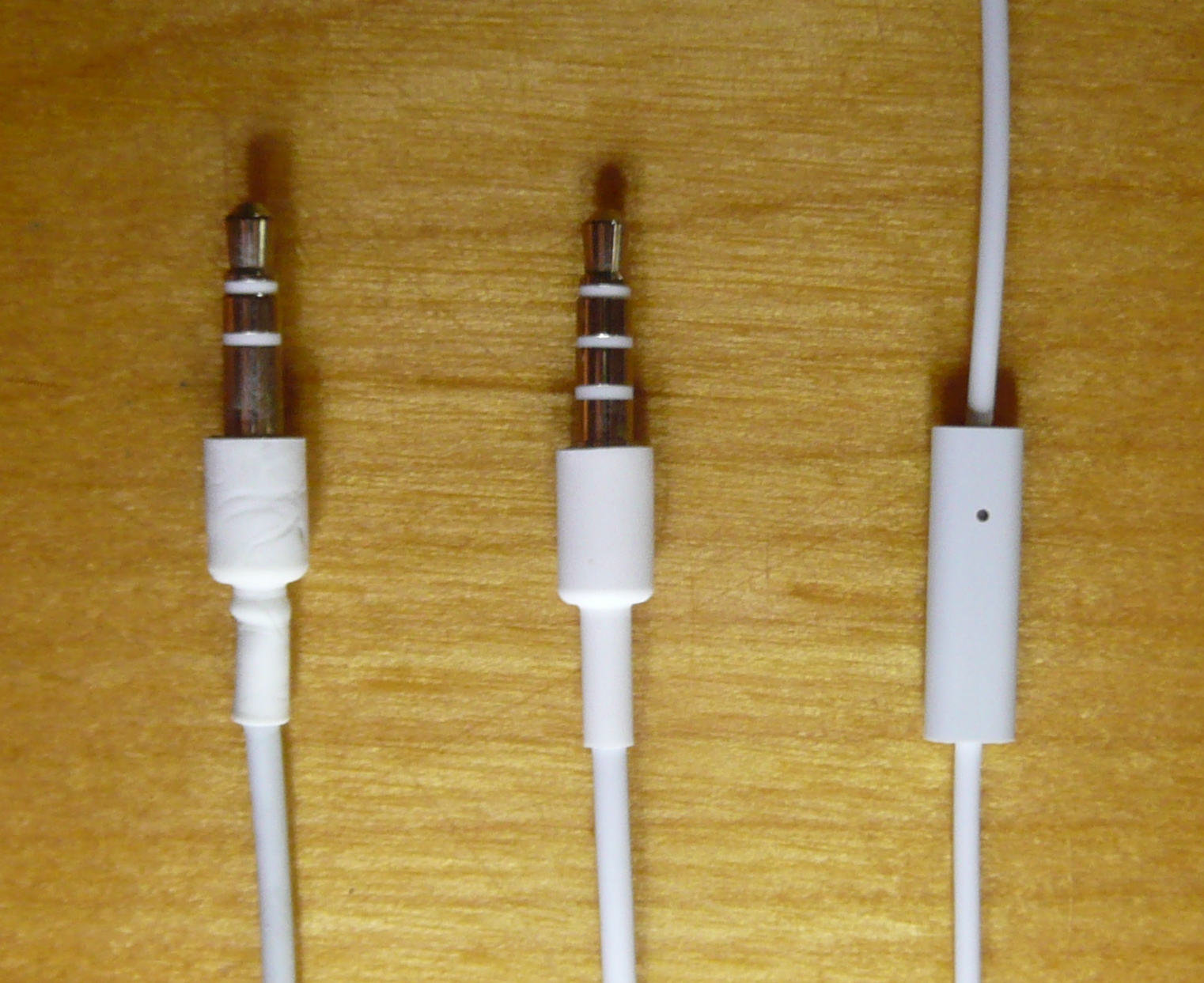
All iPhone models from the first generation to the 6S and SE (first generation) use a four-conductor (TRRS) phone connector (center) for a wired headset.

Three- or four-conductor (TRS or TRRS) 2.5 mm and 3.5 mm sockets were common on older cell phones and smartphones respectively, providing mono (three-conductor) or stereo (four-conductor) sound and a microphone input, together with signaling (e.g., push a button to answer a call). These are used both for handsfree headsets and for stereo headphones.

3.5 mm TRRS (stereo-plus-mic) sockets became particularly common on smartphones, and have been used by Nokia and others since 2006, and as mentioned in the compatibility section, they are often compatible with standard 3.5 mm stereo headphones. Many computers, especially laptops, also include a TRRS headset socket compatible with the headsets intended for smartphones.

The four conductors of a TRRS connector are assigned to different purposes by different manufacturers. Any 3.5 mm plug can be plugged mechanically into any socket, but many combinations are electrically incompatible. For example, plugging TRRS headphones into a TRS headset socket, a TRS headset into a TRRS socket, or plugging TRRS headphones from one manufacturer into a TRRS socket from another may not function correctly, or at all. Mono audio will usually work, but stereo audio or the microphone may not work, or the pause/play controls may be inactive, as is common when trying to use headphones with controls for iPhones on an Android device, or vice versa.

=== TRRS standards ===
Two different forms are frequently found. Both place left audio on the tip and right audio on the first ring, same as stereo connectors. They differ in the placement of the microphone and return contacts.

The OMTP standard places the ground return on the sleeve and the microphone on the second ring. It has been accepted as a national Chinese standard YDT 1885–2009. In the West, it is mostly used on older devices, such as older Nokia mobiles, older Samsung smartphones, and some Sony Ericsson phones. It is widely used in products meant for the Chinese market. Headsets using this wiring are sometimes indicated by black plastic separators between the rings.

The CTIA/AHJ standard reverses these contacts, putting the microphone on the sleeve. It is used by Apple's iPhone line until the 6S and SE (1st). In the West, these products made it the de facto TRRS standard. It is now used by HTC devices, recent Samsung, Nokia, and Sony phones, among others. It has the disadvantage that the microphone gets shorted to ground if the device has a metal body and the sleeve has a flange, touching the body. Headsets using this wiring are sometimes indicated by white plastic separators between the rings.

If a CTIA headset is connected to an OMTP device, the missing ground effectively connects the speakers in series, out-of-phase. This removes the singer's voice on typical popular music recordings, which place the singers in the center. If the main microphone button is held down, shorting across the microphone and restoring ground, the correct sound may be audible.

Standard	Tip	Ring 1	Ring 2	Sleeve	Devices using this standard
CTIA, AHJ	Left audio	Right audio	Ground	Microphone	Most Android devices. Apple, HTC, LG, BlackBerry, latest Nokia (including 1st generation Lumia as well as later models), latest Samsung, Jolla, Microsoft (including Surface, and Xbox One controller), Sony Playstation 4 (DualShock 4), Google Pixel 4a, Librem 5
CTIA-style AV	Left audio	Right audio	Ground	CVBS video	Apple iPod (up to 6th generation), Raspberry Pi (2014 onwards), Xbox 360 E, Zune (defunct), some older mobile phones (including Nokia N93, Nokia N95, Samsung Galaxy S GT-I9000, T-Mobile Sidekick 4G)
OMTP	Left audio	Right audio	Microphone	Ground	Old Nokia and also Lumia starting from the 2nd generation), old Samsung (2012 Chromebooks), some old Sony Ericsson smartphones (2010 and 2011 Xperias), Sony (PlayStation Vita), OnePlus One.
OMTP-style radios	Speaker	Clone	Microphone / PTT	Ground	Yaesu FT-60R amateur radio hand-held.
Video/audio 1	Left audio	CVBS video	Ground	Right audio	Sony and Panasonic camcorders. On some early Sony camcorders, this socket doubled up as a headphone socket. When a headphone plug was inserted, ring 2 was shorted to the sleeve contact and the camcorder output the right audio on ring 1.
Video/audio 2	CVBS video	Left audio	Right audio	Ground	Unknown camcorders, portable VCD and DVD players, Western Digital TV live!, some newer LG TVs.
Video/audio 3	CVBS video	Left audio	Ground	Right audio	Toshiba TVs
Video/audio 4	Left audio	Right audio	CVBS video	Ground	Grandstream GXV-3500

The four-pole 3.5 mm connector is defined by the Japanese standard JEITA/EIAJ RC-5325A, "4-Pole miniature concentric plugs and jacks", originally published in 1993. Three-pole 3.5 mm TRS connectors are defined in JIS C 6560. See also JIS C 5401 and IEC 60130-8.

Apple's iPod Shuffle 2G reuses its TRRS socket not just for audio but also for charging and syncing over USB when docked.

==== Interoperability ====
The USB Type-C Cable and Connector Specification specifies a mapping from a USB-C jack to a four-pole TRRS jack, for the use of headsets, and supports both CTIA and OMTP (YD/T 1885–2009) modes. Some devices transparently handle many jack standards, and there are hardware implementations of this available as components. This is accomplished in some cases by applying a voltage to the sleeve and second ring to detect the wiring. The last two conductors may then be switched to allow a device made to one standard to be used with a headset made to the other.

=== TRRRS standards ===
A TRRRS standard for 3.5 mm connectors was developed by ITU-T. The standard, called P.382 (formerly P.MMIC), outlines technical requirements and test methods for a 5-conductor socket and plug configuration. Compared to the TRRS standard, TRRRS provides one extra conductor that can be used for connecting a second microphone or providing power to or from the audio accessory.

P.382 requires compliant sockets and plugs to be backward compatible with legacy TRRS and TRS connectors. Therefore, P.382-compliant TRRRS connectors should allow for seamless integration when used on new products. TRRRS connectors enable the following audio applications: active noise canceling, binaural recording and others, where dual analog microphone lines can be directly connected to a host device. It was commonly found on Sony phones starting with the Xperia Z1, Xperis XZ1 and Xperia 1 II.

Another TRRRS standard for 4.4 mm connectors following JEITA RC-8141C was introduced in 2015 and is used for balanced audio connections, in particular for headphone cables. This connector is often called a Pentaconn connector, following the brand name of Nippon DICS (NDICS). It is used by some Sony products like the M1Z Walkman of their Signature series and by some Sennheiser products like the HD 820 headphone or the HDV 820 DAC headphone amplifier.

== Switch contacts ==
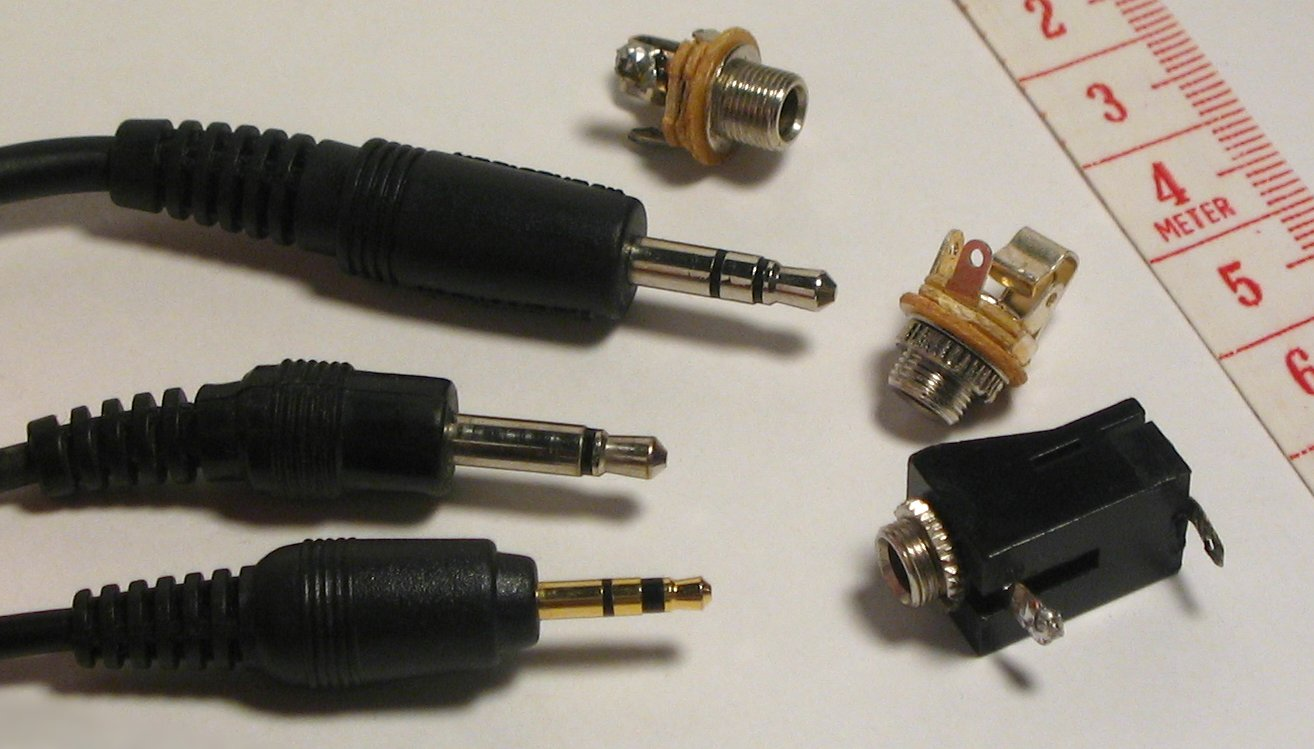
Miniature phone plugs and jacks. All are 3.5 mm except the gold-plated plug, which is 2.5 mm. One of the 3.5 mm jacks is two-conductor and the others are three conductor. In this collection the tan-colored jacks have normally-closed switches.

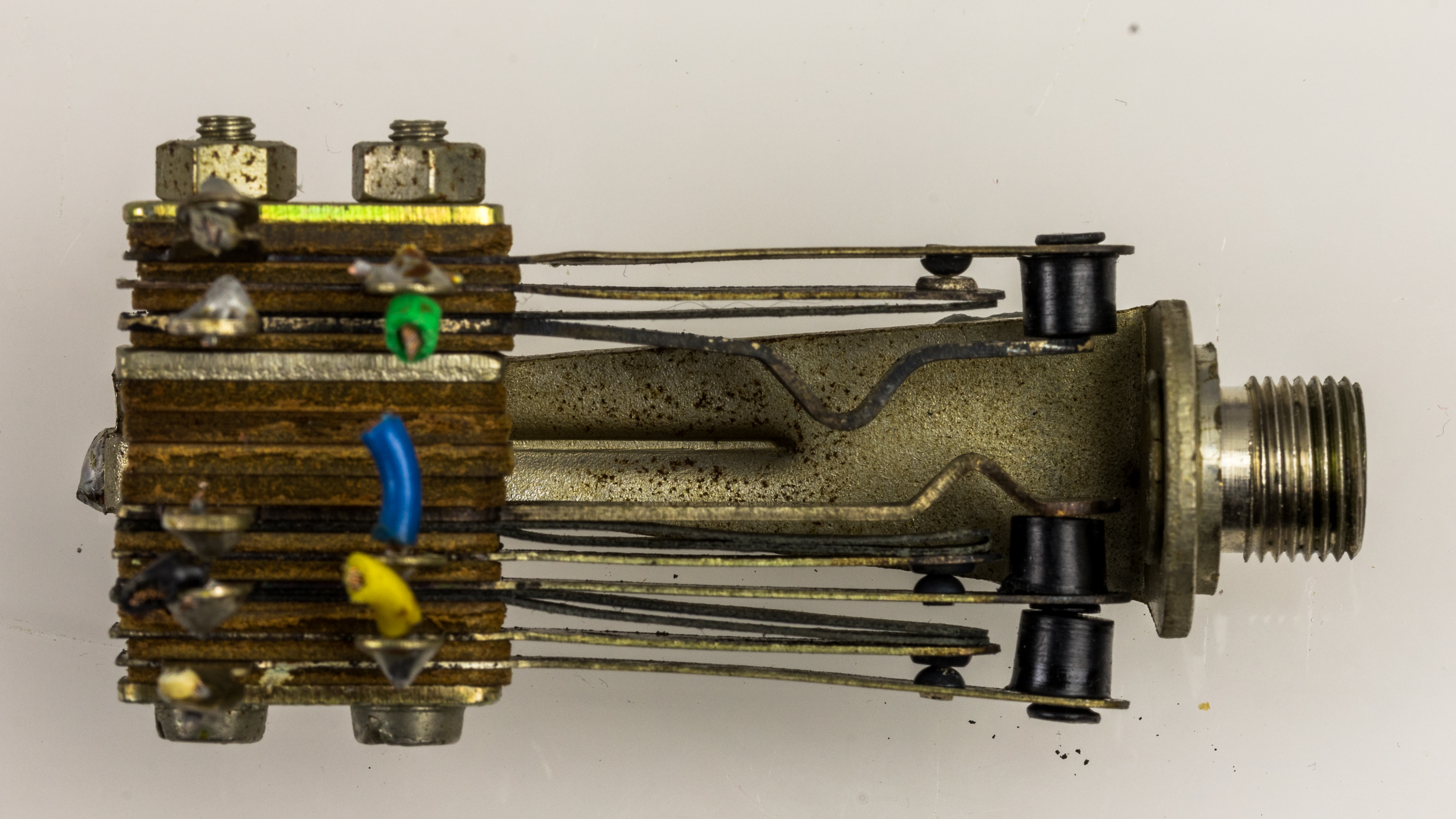
Phone connector, 6.35 mm, jack with switch contacts

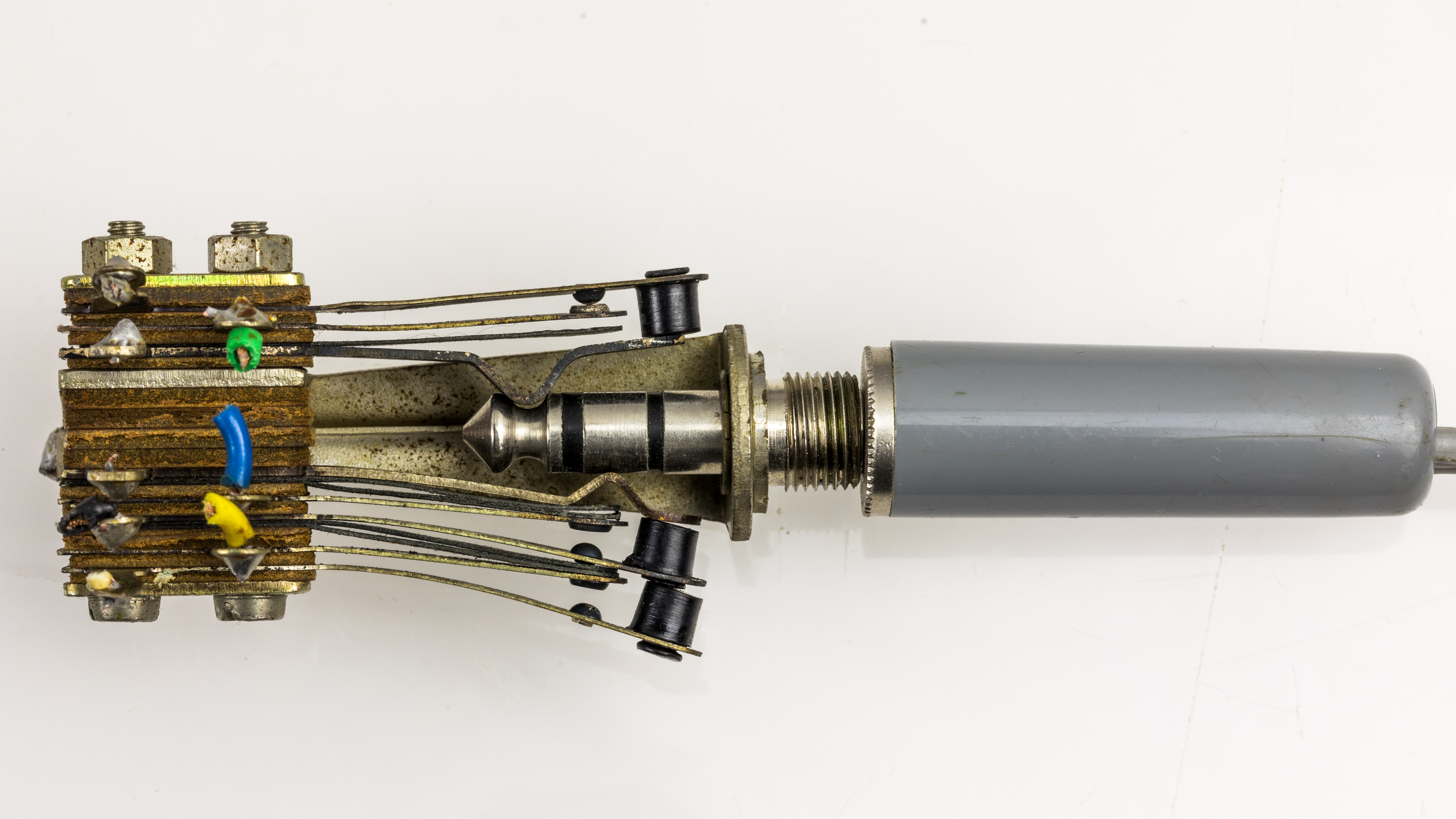
Phone connector, 6.35 mm, jack with switch contacts and plug inserted

Panel-mounted jacks may include switch contacts. Most commonly, a mono jack is provided with one normally closed (NC) contact, which is connected to the tip (live) connection when no plug is in the socket, and disconnected when a plug is inserted. Stereo sockets commonly provide two such NC contacts, one for the tip (left channel) and one for the ring or collar (right channel). Some jacks also have such a connection on the sleeve. As this contact is usually ground, it is not much use for signal switching but could be used to indicate to electronic circuitry that the jack is in use. Less commonly, jacks may feature normally open (NO) or change-over contacts or the switch contacts may be isolated from the connector signals.

The original purpose of these contacts was for switching in telephone exchanges, for which there were many patterns. Two sets of change-over contacts, isolated from the connector contacts, were common. The more recent pattern of one NC contact for each signal path, internally attached to the connector contact, stems from their use as headphone jacks. In many amplifiers and equipment containing them, such as electronic organs, a headphone jack is provided that disconnects the loudspeakers when in use. This is done by means of these switch contacts. In other equipment, a dummy load is provided when the headphones are not connected. This is also easily provided by means of these NC contacts.

Other uses for these contacts have been found. One is to interrupt a signal path in a mixing console to insert an effects processor. This is accomplished by using one NC contact of a stereo jack to connect the tip and ring together to affect a bypass when no plug is inserted. A similar arrangement is used in patch panels for normalization (see Patch panel § Normalization).

Where a 3.5 mm or 2.5 mm jack is used as a DC power inlet connector, a switch contact may be used to disconnect an internal battery whenever an external power supply is connected, to prevent incorrect recharging of the battery.

To eliminate the need for a separate power switch, a standard stereo jack is used on most battery-powered guitar effects pedals. The internal battery has its negative terminal wired to the sleeve contact of the jack. When the user plugs in a two-conductor (mono) plug, the resulting short circuit between the sleeve and ring connects an internal battery to the unit's circuitry, ensuring that it powers up or down automatically whenever a signal lead is inserted or removed.

== Design ==
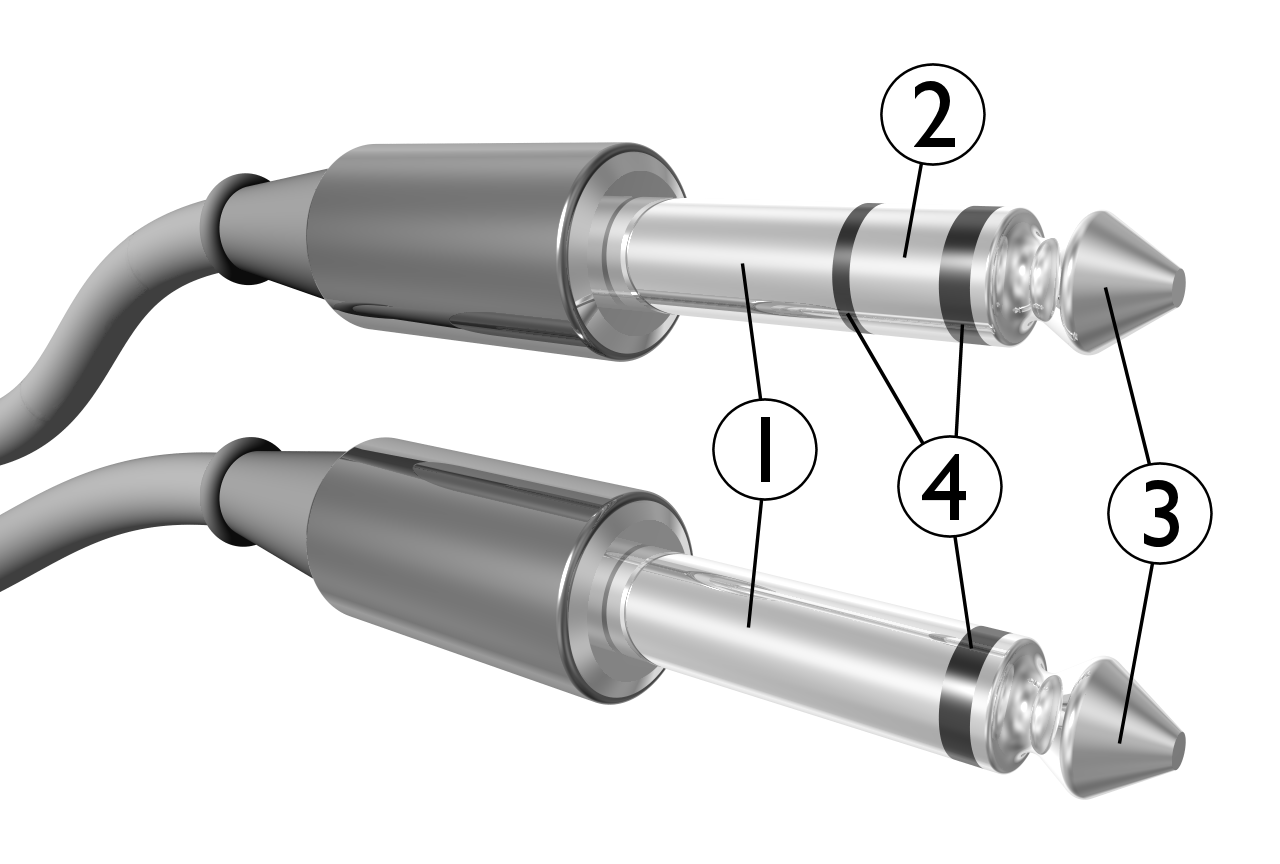
1. Sleeve: Usually ground; 2. Ring: Right-hand channel for stereo signals, negative polarity for balanced mono signals, power supply for power-using mono signal sources; 3. Tip: Left-hand channel for stereo signals, positive polarity for balanced mono signals, signal line for unbalanced mono signals; 4. Insulating rings

The connector assembly is usually made by one or more hollow and one solid pin. The jack is then assembled with pins separated by an insulating material.

Connectors that are tarnished, or that were not manufactured within tight tolerances, are prone to cause poor connections. Depending upon the surface material of the connectors, tarnished ones can be cleaned with a burnishing agent (for solid brass contacts typical) or contact cleaner (for plated contacts).

A great number of jack configurations have been used, including the following, though the simple mono and stereo jack (examples A and B) are most common:

Examples of jack configurations (oriented so the plug enters from the right)
A. Two-conductor TS phone connector (without extra switches). The connection to the sleeve is the rectangle towards the right, and the connection to the tip is the line with the notch. Wiring connections are illustrated as white circles.
B. Three-conductor TRS phone connector (without extra switches). The upper connector is the tip, as it is farther away from the sleeve. The sleeve is shown connected directly to the chassis, a typical configuration for a balanced connection. Some jacks use plastic, to isolate the sleeve from the chassis, and provide a separate sleeve connection point, as in A.
C. Three-conductor jack with two isolated SPDT switches activated by a plug going into the jack, which disconnects one throw and connects the other. The white arrowheads indicate a mechanical connection, while the black arrowheads indicate an electrical connection. This configuration is useful for a device that turns on when a plug is inserted, and off otherwise, with the power routed through the switches.
D. Three-conductor jack with two normally closed switches connected to the contacts themselves. This is useful for patch panel normalization. Another common use is as stereo headphone jack that shuts off the default output (speakers) when the connector is plugged in.

== Audio signals ==
Pin	Unbalanced mono		Balanced mono in/out (simplex) (Note: The first version of the popular Mackie 1604 mixer, the CR1604, used a tip negative, ring positive jack wiring scheme on the main left and right outputs.) (Note: Early QSC amplifiers used a tip negative, ring positive input wiring scheme.)	Unbalanced stereo
Pin	In/out (simplex)	Insert	Balanced mono in/out (simplex)	Unbalanced stereo
Tip	Signal	Send or return signal	Positive, hot	Left channel
Ring	Ground, or no connection	Return or send signal	Negative, cold	Right channel
Sleeve	Ground (Note: Whirlwind Line Balancer/Splitters do not use the sleeve as a conductor on their unbalanced 6.35 mm/1/4 in TRS phone input. Tip and ring are wired to the transformer's two terminals; the sleeve is not connected.)			

=== Balanced audio ===
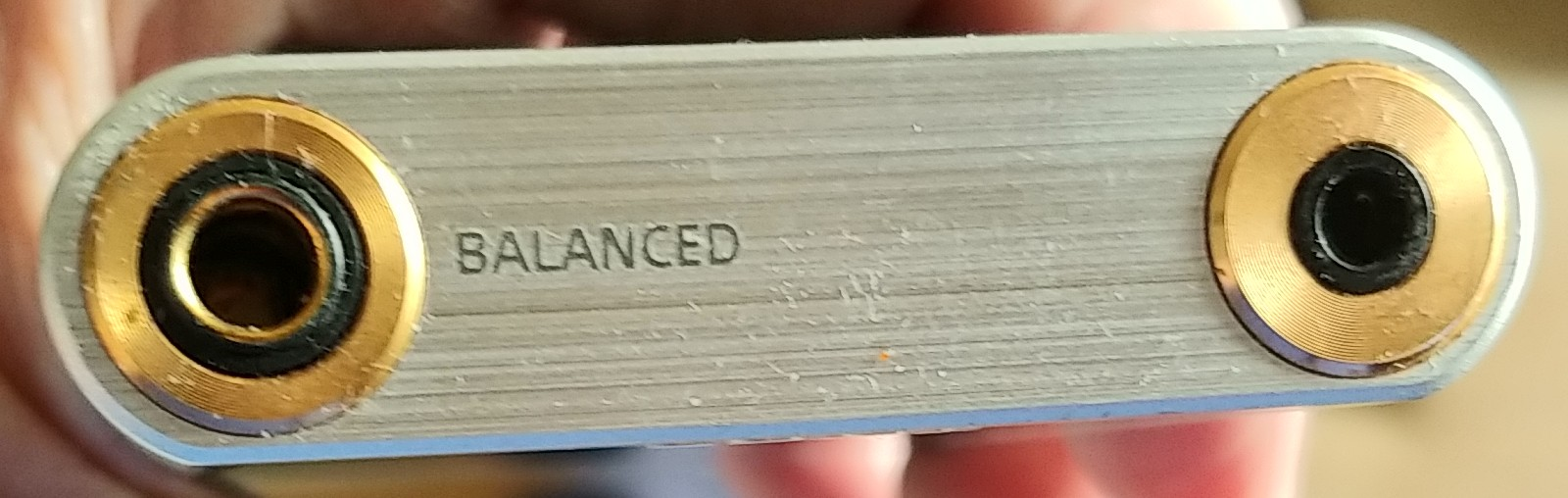
The Sony Walkman NW-ZX300 has a balanced 4.4 mm Pentaconn output alongside a standard 3.5 mm unbalanced output.

When a phone connector is used to make a balanced audio connection, the two active conductors are used for differential versions of a monaural signal. The ring, used for the right channel in stereo systems, is used instead for the inverting input.

==== Advantages ====
Where space is a premium, TRS connectors offer a more compact alternative to XLR connectors, and so are common in small audio mixing desks.

Another advantage offered by TRS connectors used for balanced microphone inputs is that a standard unbalanced signal lead using a TS phone jack can simply be plugged into such an input. The inverting input on the ring contact gets correctly grounded when it makes contact with the plug body.

==== Disadvantages ====
When using non-switching phone connectors to make balanced audio connections, the socket grounds the plug tip and ring when inserting or disconnecting the plug, and the ground mates last. This causes bursts of hum, cracks and pops and may stress some outputs as they will be short circuited briefly, or longer if the plug is left half in.

This problem does not occur with XLR or when using gauge B which although it is of 0.25 in (6.35 mm) diameter has a smaller tip and a recessed ring so that the ground contact of the socket never touches the tip or ring of the plug. This type was designed for balanced audio use, being the original telephone switchboard connector and is still common in broadcast, telecommunications and many professional audio applications where it is vital that permanent circuits being monitored are not interrupted by the insertion or removal of connectors. This same tapered shape used in the gauge B plug can be seen also in aviation and military applications on various diameters of jack connector including the PJ-068 and Bantam plugs. The more common straight-sided profile used in domestic and commercial applications and discussed in most of this article is known as gauge A.

Alternatively, some switched audio jacks contain built-in isolated switches that only activate when the plug is fully inserted. This can be used to avoid the insertion issue, for instance by wiring the connectors through a double pole, double throw switch that activates only upon full insertion. Or for instance by having the switch control a circuit that gracefully ramps up the audio once the plug is fully inserted and mutes the audio when not fully inserted.

=== Unbalanced audio ===
Phone connectors with three conductors are also commonly used as unbalanced audio patch points (or insert points, or simply inserts), with the output on many mixers found on the tip and the input on the ring. This is often expressed as tip send, ring return. (Note: An advantage of the tip send patch point is that if it is used as an output only, a 2-conductor mono phone plug correctly grounds the input.) Older mixers and some outboard gear (Note: The TRS ring send configuration is still found on some compressor sidechain input jacks such as the dbx 166XL.) have unbalanced insert points with ring send, tip return. (Note: Use of a tip return insert style allows a mono phone plug to bring an unbalanced signal directly into the circuit, though in this case the output must be robust enough to withstand being grounded.)

In many implementations, the switch contact within the panel socket is used to close the circuit between send and return when the patch point has no plug inserted. Combining send and return functions via single 1/4 in TRS connectors halves the space needed for insert jack fields which would otherwise require two jacks, one for send and one for return. (Note: The tradeoff is that this scheme does not support balanced signals and unbalanced signals are more prone to buzz, hum and outside interference.)

In some three-conductor TRS phone inserts, the concept is extended by using specially designed phone jacks that will accept a mono phone plug partly inserted to the first click and will then connect the tip to the signal path without breaking it. Standard TRS connectors may also be used in this way with varying success.

In some very compact equipment including modular synthesizers, 3.5 mm TS phone connectors are used for patch points.

== See also ==
- Banana connector
- Coaxial power connector
- Dual headphone adapter
