= Reminderband =

Silicone wristband manufacturer

Reminderband Inc.
- Type: Private
- Industry: Manufacturing, Event management, Entertainment
- Founded: November 2004
- Founder: Scott Huskinson, Clay Broadbent
- Headquarters: Logan, Utah, United States
- Area served: Worldwide
- Key people: Scott Huskinson & Clay Broadbent – Partners, Steve Hansen – President
- Products: silicon wristbands, silicon bracelets, iPod accessories
- Number of employees: 10 - 25
- Website: https://www.reminderband.com

Reminderband Inc. is an American international company that manufactures and sells customized silicone wristbands and bracelets for multiple markets, including healthcare, entertainment/recreation, law enforcement, and more. With its headquarters in Logan, Utah, Reminderband also has a logistics and development center in Hong Kong.

As one of the first companies to offer custom silicone bracelets and wristbands, Reminderband Inc. has developed a model of production and distribution that allows the company to produce custom wristbands in quantities as low as one and many as millions and have their warehouses ship them world-wide.

Reminderband has been in business since 2004 and has sold more than 50 million wristbands. The company has a Better Business Bureau ranking of A+ and a Shopper Approved Overall Satisfaction Rating of 4.8.

== History ==
Reminderband was launched in November 2004 by Clay Broadbent, and Scott Huskinson.

In 2005, the company sold about 9 million of the wristbands and was the official provider of the wristband of the Tour de France with its bands worn by thousands at the Tour including cyclists, fans, police security and reporters.

In 2006, Reminderband's founders launched a subsidiary company called iFrogz, a line of silicone iPhone cases and headphones, which had placements in Wal-Mart, AT&T and Best Buy. In 2011, Reminderband's founders sold the iFrogz subsidiary company to ZAGG, a publicly traded company based out of Salt Lake City, but kept the wristband product line.

In the years following, Reminderband launched other products, including wristband variations and awareness ribbon pins and keychains. In February 2016, Reminderband added customizable Tyvek wristbands to their available products.

Reminderband supplies custom wristbands for corporate, charitable, and individual causes such as Test Me I'm Clean, Olympian Dee Dee Trotter's charity against performance-enhancing drug use. The company has also produced customized wristbands for The Home Depot, Wayne State University, the Dallas Mavericks, the Boys and Girls Club of America, the YMCA, the Orlando Magic, and 'Extreme Makeover Home Edition' Volunteers.

== See also ==
- Gel bracelet
- Livestrong wristband
- Silicone bracelets
- Wristband
- Medical alert bracelets
