= Speck Products =

- Type: Subsidiary of Telementum Global, LLC
- Industry: Consumer Electronics
- Founded: 2001
- Headquarters: San Mateo, California
- Website: speckproducts.com

Speculative Product Design, doing business as Speck Products is a San Mateo, California-based company that makes protective cases for portable electronic devices including iPad, iPhone, MacBook, Android devices, Windows Phone devices, tablets and eReaders. It became a subsidiary of Samsonite on 29 May 2014. who later sold Speck to Telementum Global, LLC in July 2021.

== History ==
Speck was founded in 2001 by Ryan Mongan, David Law and Tony Lillios as an offshoot of Speck Design.

In 2006, Irene Baran joined Speck as CEO. She is a member of the Women in CE Hall of Fame.

In May 2014, Samsonite purchased Speck Products for $85 million from VMG Partners.

In July 2021, Telementum Global, LLC acquired Speck from Samsonite.

== Products ==
Speck Products makes cases such as the SmartFlex Card phone case and the HandyShell tablet case.

Other Speck cases include its CandyShell line, PixelSkin HD and FabShell for smartphones; FitFolio and SmartShell for tablets and eReaders; and SeeThru and SmartShell lines for MacBook.

Presidio case range for smartphones and laptops was first introduced for the iPhone 7 in 2016, and has expanded to include most smartphones. These cases are thinner than the previous CandyShell line.

== Awards ==
- Speck was featured on the Inc. 5000 fastest growing private companies list in 2006, 2007 and 2008, and has been ranked as high as #41.
- Speck cases were chosen as iLounge's iPhone Case of the Year in 2009 (CandyShell for iPhone 3GS and iPhone 3G), 2010 (PixelSkin HD for iPhone 4), 2011 (CandyShell Flip for iPhone 4S and iPhone 4) and 2012 (CandyShell Flip for iPhone 5).
- CandyShell Wrap for iPad 2 was named iLounge iPad Case of the Year for 2011. This case was also selected as an International CES Innovations 2012 Design and Engineering Awards Nominee.
- SpeckProducts.com was named as a Webby Awards 2012 Honoree in the Best Practices category.
