= Dual headphone adapter =

A dual headphone adapter, also known as a "headphone splitter" or "audio jack splitter", is a device that allows two headphones to be connected through to one audio jack. They can be used to listen to audio through multiple audio input devices, such as headphones on devices such as an MP3 player, CD player, modern Computer with audio-out compatibility (such as a headphone socket) or boombox. Although earbuds, a type of headphone design, can be shared with a bud (with one "bud" in another's ear), a dual headphone adapter can be more practical. Dual headphone adapters can be purchased at various audio and electronic stores. Headphone adapters can be used by inserting a 3.5mm Audio jack plug into the headphone jack.

== Types of headphone adapters ==
Many designs of headphone adapters have been created by various individuals and/or manufacturers. The most common types are the "Y" design, adapters with up to six headphone sockets, and wired headphone adapters.

== See also ==
- Phone connector (audio)
